= Group A nerve fiber =

One of three classes of nerve fiber

Group A nerve fibers are one of the three classes of nerve fiber as generally classified by Erlanger and Gasser. The other two classes are the group B nerve fibers, and the group C nerve fibers. Group A are heavily myelinated, group B are moderately myelinated, and group C are unmyelinated.

The other classification is a sensory grouping that uses the terms type Ia and type Ib, type II, type III, and type IV, sensory fibers.

== Types ==
There are four subdivisions of group A nerve fibers: alpha (α) Aα; beta (β) Aβ; , gamma (γ) Aγ, and delta (δ) Aδ. These subdivisions have different amounts of myelination and axon thickness and therefore transmit signals at different speeds. Larger diameter axons and more myelin insulation lead to faster signal propagation.

Group A nerves are found in both motor and sensory pathways.

Motor fiber types
Type	Erlanger-Gasser Classification	Diameter	Myelin	Conduction velocity	Associated muscle fibers
α	Aα	13–20 μm	Yes	80–120 m/s	Extrafusal muscle fibers
γ	Aγ	5–8 μm	Yes	4–24 m/s	Intrafusal muscle fibers

Different sensory receptors are innervated by different types of nerve fibers. Proprioceptors are innervated by type Ia, Ib and II sensory fibers, mechanoreceptors by type II and III sensory fibers, and nociceptors and thermoreceptors by type III and IV sensory fibers.

Sensory fiber types
Type	Erlanger-Gasser Classification	Diameter	Myelin	Conduction velocity	Associated sensory receptors
Ia	Aα	13–20 μm ~17 μm	Yes	80–120 m/s 70–120 m/s	Nuclear bag and nuclear chain intrafusal muscle fibers of muscle spindles
Ib	Aα	13–20 μm ~16 μm	Yes	80–120 m/s	Golgi tendon organ
II	Aα	~8 μm	Yes		Nuclear chain intrafusal muscle fibers of muscle spindles
II	Aβ	6–12 μm	Yes	33–75 m/s	All cutaneous mechanoreceptors including pacinian corpuscles
III	Aδ	1–5 μm	Thin	3–30 m/s	Free nerve endings of touch and pressure Nociceptors of neospinothalamic tract Cold thermoreceptors
IV	C	0.2–1.5 μm	No	0.5–2.0 m/s	Nociceptors of paleospinothalamic tract Warmth receptors

Type Aα fibers include the type Ia and type Ib sensory fibers of the alternative classification system, and are the fibers from muscle spindle endings and the Golgi tendon, respectively.

Type Aβ fibres, and type Aγ, are the type II afferent fibers from stretch receptors. Type Aβ fibres from the skin are mostly dedicated to touch. However a small fraction of these fast fibres, termed "ultrafast nociceptors", also transmit pain.

Type Aδ fibers are the afferent fibers of nociceptors. Aδ fibers carry information from peripheral mechanoreceptors and thermoreceptors to the dorsal horn of the spinal cord. This pathway describes the first-order neuron. Aδ fibers serve to receive and transmit information primarily relating to acute pain (sharp, immediate, and relatively short-lasting). This type of pain can result from several classifications of stimulants: temperature-induced, mechanical, and chemical. This can be part of a withdrawal reflex—initiated by the Aδ fibers in the reflex arc of activating withdrawal responses. These are the type III group. Aδ fibers carry cold, pressure, and acute pain signals; because they are thin (2–5 μm in diameter) and myelinated, they send impulses faster than unmyelinated C fibers, but more slowly than other, more thickly myelinated group A nerve fibers. Their conduction velocities are moderate.

Their cell bodies are located in the dorsal root ganglia and axons are sent to the periphery to innervate target organs and are also sent through the dorsal roots to the spinal cord. Within the spinal cord the axons reach the posterior grey column and terminate in Rexed laminae I to V.
