= Aging movement control =

Changes in men and women as they get older

Normal aging movement control in humans is about the changes in the muscles, motor neurons, nerves, sensory functions, gait, fatigue, visual and manual responses, in men and women as they get older but who do not have neurological, muscular (atrophy, dystrophy...) or neuromuscular disorder. With aging, neuromuscular movements are impaired, though with training or practice, some aspects may be prevented.

== Force production ==
For voluntary force production, action potentials occur in the cortex. They propagate in the spinal cord, the motor neurons and the set of muscle fibers they innervate. This results in a twitch which properties are driven by two mechanisms: motor unit recruitment and rate coding. Both mechanisms are affected with aging. For instance, the number of motor units may decrease, the size of the motor units, i.e. the number of muscle fibers they innervate may increase, the frequency at which the action potentials are triggered may be reduced. Consequently, force production is generally impaired in old adults.

Aging is associated with decreases in muscle mass and strength. These decreases may be partially due to losses of alpha motor neurons. By the age of 70, these losses occur in both proximal and distal muscles. In biceps brachii and brachialis, old adults show decreased strength (by 1/3) correlated with a reduction in the number of motor units (by 1/2). Old adults show evidence that remaining motor units may become larger as motor units innervate collateral muscle fibers.

In first dorsal interosseus, almost all motor units are recruited at moderate rate coding, leading to 30-40% of maximal voluntary contraction (MVC). Motor unit discharge rates measured at 50% MVC are not significantly different in the young subjects from those observed in the old adults. However, for the maximal effort contractions, there is an appreciable difference in discharge rates between the two age groups. Discharge rates obtained at 100% of MVC are 64% smaller in the old adults than in the young subjects: 31.1 ± 11.8 impulses/s in the old subjects, 50.9 ± 19.5 impulses/s in the young subjects.

Isometric strength and physical cross-sectional area of the elbow flexors and elbow extensors are reduced in old compared with young men. The normalized force (maximal voluntary force to the size of the muscle producing the force) of the elbow extensors is the same for old and young people. The normalized force for the elbow flexors is reduced in the old men compared to the young men. The lower normalized force of the elbow flexors may be due to an increase in agonist-antagonist muscles coactivation.

Compared to the young group, the old group has lower dorsiflexors isometric torque at all angles, has lower knee extensors isometric torque at angles >90°. The impairment in force production is muscle specific. During dynamic exercise, the old group requires more time to reach a target velocity and is less able to attain high velocities. The slowing of voluntary contractile speed with age seems to play a role in the loss of dynamic torque.

== Sensory function ==
The detection of a stimulus by a receptor in the afferent nerve terminals (vs efferent nerve terminals) is useful to protect the body against unexpected disturbances. Studies in post-mortem subjects support that the thickness of muscle spindle capsules increases with age. There is a slight decrease in the number of intrafusal fibers in the oldest subjects. Some spindles show changes consistent with denervation associated with grouped denervation atrophy. Age-related changes are observed in fine structure of spindle nerve innervation in the form of axonal swelling and expanded/abnormal endplates.

When subject to a task of proprioception, the elderly show increased cocontraction of agonist-antagonist muscles, perhaps to increase gamma drive and spindle sensitivity. It is believed to be used for postural control. Despite a cocontraction strategy, old adults have higher reaction time and also make greater errors in estimating the position of their ankle. The elderly subjects with greater errors for the dynamic position sense also perform poorly on the single limb stance eyes closed test.

Old adults sway more than young adults while maintaining upright standing posture, especially with eyes closed with a narrow base of support. Young adults show "resourcefulness" by shifting from one sensory input (vision) to another (somatosensory) whereas old adults do not rely on the variety of sensory inputs but rather respond by stiffening their ankles across tasks (wide base of support vs narrow base of support, eyes open vs eyes closed).

Sensory receptors can initiate rapid responses to perturbations thanks to short-latency connections between afferent innervations and motor units. Yet, aging results in decreases in motor conduction velocities. This may be due to losses of the fastest conducting motor units. There is also evidence of slowing of both fast and slow conducting axons which can be explained by decreases in axon diameter through demyelination, by reduction of internodal length. Some studies suggest an overall decrease in the number of myelinated fibers.

Aging results in slowed reaction time in an aiming task for both eye and hand movements. Comparisons between young and old adults who have to follow a target only with their eyes or with a laser in their hand, show that parameters indicative of motor function such as velocity, duration, and amplitude of initial movement are unchanged. However the duration of corrective movement is longer for old adults. It suggests an impairment to sensory system.

== Walking gait ==
When confronted to an unexpected slip or trip during walking, compared to young adults, old adults have a less effective balance strategy: smaller and slower postural muscle responses, altered temporal and spatial organization of the postural response, agonist-antagonist muscles coactivation and greater upper trunk instability. Comparing control and slip conditions, after the perturbation, young adults have a longer stride length, a longer stride duration, and the same walk velocity whereas old adults have a shorter stride length, the same stride duration, and a lower walk velocity.

In an experiment, for a single-task walking, 24% of old adults have gait speed <0.8 m/s but for a dual-task of walking and talking, 62% of old adults have gait speed <0.8 m/s. In practical terms, this means that a large proportion of healthy community-dwelling old adults may not walk fast enough to safely cross the street while simultaneously having a conversation. These findings support the assertion that generating spontaneous speech is highly demanding on cognitive resources and suggest that real world dual-task effects on gait may be underestimated by reaction time tasks.

== Fatigue resistance ==
Compared to young adults, old adults exhibit muscle fatigue (peripheral fatigue) resistance during sustained isometric maximal voluntary contraction, but they show greater supraspinal fatigue at start of sustained task, and during recovery. The first observation reflects changes in fiber type ratio; with aging the proportion of type I muscle fibers which are adapted to long effort becomes greater. The second observation is likely a result of cumulative effects of exercise on the central nervous system.

For the knee extensors, old adults produce less torque during dynamic or isometric maximal voluntary contractions than young adults. The mechanisms controlling fatigue in the elderly during isometric contractions are not the same as those that influence fatigue during dynamic contractions, while young adults keep the same strategy. The knee extensors of healthy old adults fatigue less during isometric contractions than do those of young adults who had similar levels of habitual physical activity. In contrast, there are no differences between age groups in the fatigue during dynamic contractions.

== Speed, dexterity ==
For old adults, the decreased saccadic accuracy, prolonged latency, and reduced saccadic velocity may be explained by cerebral cortical degeneration with age. Old adults show reduced amplitude of primary saccades and they generally more saccades to reach fixation. Old adults show significant delay of saccades in all conditions (predictable amplitude and time target steps, unpredictable amplitude target steps, unpredictable time target steps). Age-related slowing is only evident for predictable targets; however other studies have shown otherwise but noted higher variance in speed of old adults.

Instructed to look either toward (pro-saccade task) or away from (anti-saccade task) an eccentric target under different conditions of fixation, for young children (5±8 years of age) a long time elapses between the apparition of the target and the onset of the eye movement (Saccadic Reaction Time). Young adults (20±30 years of age) typically have the fastest SRTs. Elderly subjects (60±79 years of age) have slower SRTs and longer duration saccades than any other age groups.

Old adults exhibit reductions in manual dexterity which is observed through changes in fingertip force when gripping and/or lifting. Compared to young adults, old adults show an increase in grip force and safety margins (minimum force necessary to prevent a slip). These increases can be explained by skin slipperiness or it may be the result of declining cutaneous information. Force increases are not associated with impaired capacity to modulate fingertip forces smoothly. There is no evidence that old adults were less able to program fingertips based on the memory of a preceding lift.

The prismatic grasp (4 fingers in opposition to thumb) which is common in everyday activities, involves the organization of the digits into specific tasks and the balance of force/moment production by individual digits. Old adults exhibit an impairment in finger and hand force production. They show excessive grip force which could be related to higher moments produced by antagonist fingers. Both can be viewed as energetically suboptimal but more stable performance.

Old adults often show heightened antagonist muscle coactivation during goal directed movement. Contractions at moderate-to-high force often show activation of other ipsilateral and contralateral muscles. When the intensity of contralateral activity is sufficient to produce movement, this is called "mirror movement". When asked to follow a unilateral task, young and old adults show concurrent activity in contralateral muscle but it is greater in old adults. Contralateral activity is greater for isometric than for anisometric contractions. Contralateral force is greater for eccentric than concentric contractions.

== Training consequences ==
Type I muscle fiber characteristics (area, number of capillary contacts, fiber area/capillary contacts) of the vastus lateralis are unaffected by age. The old men normal fit or trained have smaller type II muscle fiber areas and fewer capillaries surrounding these fibers than do the young men. The capillary supply per unit type II fiber area is not affected by age but is enhanced by training. The old trained men have succinate dehydrogenase activities within their type IIa muscle fibers similar to those in young men and twofold higher than in old normal fit men.

Neural changes like reduced motor unit discharge rates, increased variability of motor unit discharge activity, altered recruitment and derecruitment behavior mediate modifications in muscle control. On the other hand, physiological deleterious factors including motor unit loss, increased motor unit innervation ratios also affect muscle force. Through strength training, old adults can significantly improve their force control. The rapid adaptation suggests modifications in motor unit activation, increased excitability of motoneuron pool, and decreased antagonist cocontraction.

Heavy resistance and sensorimotor trainings result in increased maximum voluntary contraction and rate force development. But sensorimotor training shows more positive adaptations in postural reflexes, which is likely due to training of sensory reception/processing, central integration of afferent information, transformation of that information into adequate efferent response. The decreased onset latency and increased magnitude of reflex response with sensorimotor training is associated with increased ankle joint stiffness during perturbations.

When asked to reach a given level of force at a certain moment in time without any visual feedback, old adults are less accurate than young adults. With the practice of goal-directed contractions, old adults can improve the accuracy of novel motor tasks (isometric or dynamic) though their strategy differs from the strategy used by young adults. For both age groups, the greatest improvements in accuracy occur at the beginning of practice.

Old adults are able to improve the modulation of grasping forces after motor practice. Unexpectedly, motor practice fails to reduce grasping performance losses under the dual-task conditions but motor practice reduces the decline in cognitive performance under dual-task conditions. Therefore, motor practice seems to free up cognitive resources that were previously monitoring motor performance and old adults seemed to use these resources to improve their cognitive performance under dual-task conditions.
