= Motor pool (neuroscience) =

Group of motor neurons that innervate a muscle

A motor pool consists of all individual motor neurons that innervate a single muscle. Each individual muscle fiber is innervated by only one motor neuron, but one motor neuron may innervate several muscle fibers. This distinction is physiologically significant because the size of a given motor pool determines the activity of the muscle it innervates: for example, muscles responsible for finer movements are innervated by motor pools consisting of higher numbers of individual motor neurons. Motor pools are also distinguished by the different classes of motor neurons that they contain. The size, composition, and anatomical location of each motor pool is tightly controlled by complex developmental pathways.

== Anatomy ==
The motor unit: a single motor neuron and the muscle fibers that it innervates. A motor pool consists of all of the motor neurons that innervate a single muscle.

Distinct skeletal muscles are controlled by groups of individual motor units. Such motor units are made up of a single motor neuron and the muscle fibers that it innervates. The cell bodies of motor neurons are located in the ventral horn of the spinal cord and the brainstem. These neurons innervate skeletal muscle fibers through the propagation of action potentials down their axons (through ventral roots and cranial nerves), and they stimulate skeletal muscle fibers at neuromuscular junctions where they synapse with the motor end plates of muscle fibers. In humans, these axons can be as long as one meter. Motor neurons themselves fall into three main classes: alpha-motor neurons control extrafusal muscle fibers, meaning that they innervate skeletal muscles leading to movement; gamma-motor neurons innervate intrafusal muscle fibers, controlling the sensitivity of muscle spindles to stretch; beta-motor neurons are capable of synapsing on either type of muscle fiber. Alpha-motor neurons can further be divided into three separate subclasses, distinguished according to the contractile properties of the motor units that they form: fast-twitch fatigable (FF), fast-twitch fatigue-resistant (FR), and slow-twitch fatigue-resistant (S). The composition of a motor pool may consist of multiple classes and subclasses of motor neurons.

Motor pools in the spinal cord are clustered in distinct columns of motor neurons extending over multiple spinal cord segments; although, there is significant overlap. Motor pools that control proximal muscles are generally located medial to the ventral horn, while those that control distal muscles are located laterally. Motor pools that control flexor muscles are located dorsally to the ventral horn while those that control extensor muscles are located ventrally.

The number of motor neurons in an individual motor pool is highly variable and can generally be predicted by the level of nuanced control that a specific muscle requires. For example, some muscles have relatively low numbers of motor units in their respective motor pools while others, with highly nuanced control (such as the muscles in the human hand) have higher densities of motor units.

== Function ==
Motor pools function primarily to integrate synaptic input from higher CNS centers into precise and consistent contraction patterns. Individual motor neurons within a given motor pool fire in accordance with what is known as the 'size principle'. The size principle was proposed by Elwood Henneman and his group in the 1960s as an explanation of the characteristic pattern with which individual motor neurons in a motor pool fire. The size principle stipulates that when the motor neurons of a motor pool fire, leading to the contraction of a terminal muscle fiber, the motor units containing the smallest motor neurons fire first. As excitatory signalling increases, larger motor neurons are subsequently recruited and contraction strength increases. Further, this differential recruitment of motor neurons occurs in instances of both increasing and decreasing contraction strength. As contraction strength is increased, the smallest motor units fire first and are also the last to stop firing as the contraction strength decreases.

The size principle has important functional benefits. Primarily, this system frees higher centers of the CNS from having to signal specific contraction patterns for distinct levels of muscle contraction. The level of synaptic input that higher centers provide to a given motor pool must determine the contraction strength, and this simplifies the process of contraction strength modulation. This system allows for very precise and consistent modulation of contraction strength from just increased or decreased levels of synaptic input: with additional motor units of increasing size, there will be a consistent and precise effect on the force of contraction. Another key benefit derived from the size principle is that smaller neurons will be fired more regularly and for a longer duration of time compared to larger neurons. These smaller motor units are more resistant to fatigue, and as such, are better suited to this role.

== Specialization and development ==
There are several layers of differentiation and specialization to consider the complicated development of motor pools.

=== Alpha- and gamma-motor neuron differentiation ===
Alpha motor neurons and gamma motor neurons do not merely differ in their postsynaptic targets. The physiological differences between these two classes are significant. The axonal diameter of gamma-motor neurons is half of that of alpha-motor neurons, resulting in a higher cytoplasmic resistance and therefore a slower signal propagation velocity. Additionally, gamma-motor neurons display far simpler branching patterns than that of their alpha- counterparts. The differentiation into these two classes is regulated by complex interactions between several neurotrophic factors, and all of these interactions are not yet well understood. Glial cell line-derived neurotrophic factor (GDNF) has been discovered to play an especially important role in all layers of motor pool development. In the case of alpha- and gamma- differentiation, it has been shown that gamma motor neurons express significantly higher levels of certain GDNF receptor subunits.

=== Alpha-motor neuron muscle fiber targets ===
Alpha motor neurons are also grouped into subclasses based on the types of muscle fibers they target, which also determines their functional characteristics. Motor neurons that target fast-twitch, fatigable (FF) muscle fibers are the largest (and therefore the fastest in propagating signals); those that target fast-twitch, fatigue-resistant (FR) fibers are of intermediate size; and those that target slow-twitch, fatigue-resistant (S) fibers are the smallest. In addition to signaling velocity, the range of sizes across these subclasses also forms the physiological basis of the size principle. Due to their relatively small axonal diameter, neurons that target S type fibers require a smaller input current to reach threshold potential. Conversely, the largest neurons, which target FF type fibers, require a greater input current to reach threshold. Therefore, the axonal diameter of the three subclasses of alpha motor neurons clearly determines the patterns of the recruitment of motor units predicted by the size principle. The specific regulatory mechanisms that determine the size of these three alpha-motor neuron subclasses are not well known.

=== Pool specificity and spatial orientation ===
At a further level of specialization, specific combinations of motor neuron classes and subclasses are grouped spatially in clusters known as motor columns throughout the spinal cord. These motor columns are motor pools, and each has its own unique identity: each neuron within the pool (regardless of its class) expresses a unique profile of transcription factors, cell-surface proteins (such as axonal guidance receptors and adhesion molecules), and neurotransmitter receptors. These pool-specific biochemical markers provide the developmental framework for muscle-specific synapsing. Among this pool-specific combination of transcription factors, Hox factors play an especially important role. Hox transcription factors play a central role in the spatial orientation of the motor pool within the spine, and in the site-specific synapsing of the motor pool on to its down-stream muscle fibers.

=== Pool size ===
The number of motor neurons within a specific motor pool is a crucial developmental step. Again, little is known about the precise mechanisms and molecules involved in this process of specialization. However, it is known that the mechanism involves an initial generation of large numbers of motor neurons, followed by a pruning process that is mediated by cell death mechanisms and survival factors. Some researchers have speculated that the number of neurons within a given pool is determined by competitive interactions between different Hox genes.

== Evolution ==
Muscles responsible for finer, more nuanced movements are innervated by motor pools consisting of higher numbers of individual motor neurons. This principle is highlighted by examining the evolution of the human tongue and hand motor pools.

=== Human tongue ===
Highly refined and coordinated movements of the tongue are responsible for the intricacies of human speech. The evolutionary analysis would predict an abnormally large motor pool innervating the muscle of the human tongue, relative to those of other mammals. Such a large motor pool would allow for region-specific innervation of the tongue muscle, motor neurons with task-specificity, motor neuron specializations that allow for quick movements, and various other motor nuances necessary for producing complex speech. Anatomical analysis has validated this evolutionary prediction: in the average adult human, the motor pool for the tongue contains between 7,093 and 8,817 motor neurons. This neuron density far exceeds that measured in other mammals, and even exceeds the motor pool size for many muscles in the human body: biceps brachii, for example, is innervated by a motor pool that averages 441.5 motor neurons in size.

=== Human hand ===
The evolutionary analysis also predicts large motor pools innervating the muscles of the human hand. The human innovations of tool-making, throwing motions, and clubbing motions required unprecedented manual dexterity, only made possible by extensive networks of large motor pools innervating the human hand. As Richard Young explains:

It has been proposed that the hominid lineage began when a group of chimpanzee-like apes began to throw rocks and swing clubs at adversaries and that this behaviour yielded reproductive advantages for millions of years, driving natural selection for improved throwing and clubbing prowess. This assertion leads to the prediction that the human hand should be adapted for throwing and clubbing… thereby providing an evolutionary explanation for the two unique grips, and the extensive anatomical remodelling of the hand that made them possible.

Precise neuromuscular control allows for the sub-millisecond release times necessary for throwing. Effective clubbing requires the recruitment of several motor units to produce a secure grip through impact. These evolutionary predictions have been verified by comparative anatomical studies: the motor pools innervating the human hand are significantly larger than those innervating related primate hands.

== Relevance to disease ==
=== ALS ===
Amyotrophic lateral sclerosis (ALS) is a neurodegenerative disease that differentially affects specific motor pools and classes of motor neurons. ALS modelled in mice, for example, was shown to lead first to rapid FF motor neuron loss, followed by a delayed loss of FR neurons, leaving S type neurons largely intact in the late stages of the disease. Further, in late-stage ALS patients, death of motor neurons is pool-specific. Motor neuron death all throughout the spinal cord leads to a nearly complete loss of voluntary movement; however, ocular control and voluntary control of excretory functions remain mostly unaffected. These movements are governed by motor pools in the midbrain and in Onuf's nucleus in the lumbosacral spinal cord, respectively. Currently, research is being conducted on these ALS-resistant motor pools, and their pool-specific molecular identities are being examined for potential neuroprotective qualities.

=== Parallels in SMA and ageing ===
Spinal muscular atrophy (SMA) and ageing-related motor degeneration share clear parallels with ALS in the patterns and specificity of motor neuron loss. Though it is completely distinct from ALS in its pathogenesis, SMA leads to a similar rapid death of FF motor neurons, with S type neurons being generally spared. Further, motor pools controlling facial muscles (including those of the eye) and voluntary excretory muscles are spared. Motor neuron degeneration caused by ageing similarly affects FF types but not S types; ageing also seems to spare ocular motor pools. These similar patterns of neurodegeneration in three different diseases have led researchers to speculate that slow-twitch motor neurons, along with motor pools of the eyes and excretory muscles, have intrinsic neuroprotective properties that are not disease-specific. Research is currently being conducted to discover a possible molecular basis for neuroprotection in these cell types.

== See also ==
- Motor unit
- Motor neuron
