= Motor nerve =

Nerve exiting the central nervous system

- Diagram of afferent and efferent innervation

Details

Identifiers
- Latin: nervus motorius
- FMA: 5867

A motor nerve, or efferent nerve, is a nerve that contains exclusively efferent nerve fibers and transmits motor signals from the central nervous system (CNS) to the effector organs (muscles and glands), as opposed to sensory nerves, which transfer signals from sensory receptors in the periphery to the CNS. This is different from the motor neuron, which includes a cell body and branching of dendrites, while the nerve is made up of a bundle of axons. In the strict sense, a "motor nerve" can refer exclusively to the connection to muscles, excluding other organs. The vast majority of nerves contain both sensory and motor fibers and are therefore called mixed nerves.

== Structure and function ==
Motor nerve fibers transduce signals from the CNS to peripheral neurons of proximal muscle tissue. Motor nerve axon terminals innervate skeletal and smooth muscle, as they are heavily involved in muscle control. Motor nerves tend to be rich in acetylcholine vesicles because the motor nerve, a bundle of motor nerve axons that deliver motor signals and signal for movement and motor control. Calcium vesicles reside in the axon terminals of the motor nerve bundles. The high calcium concentration outside of presynaptic motor nerves increases the size of end-plate potentials (EPPs).

== Protective tissues ==
Within motor nerves, each axon is wrapped by the endoneurium, which is a layer of connective tissue that surrounds the myelin sheath. Bundles of axons are called fascicles, which are wrapped in perineurium. All of the fascicles wrapped in the perineurium are wound together and wrapped by a final layer of connective tissue known as the epineurium. These protective tissues defend nerves from injury, pathogens and help to maintain nerve function. Layers of connective tissue maintain the rate at which nerves conduct action potentials.

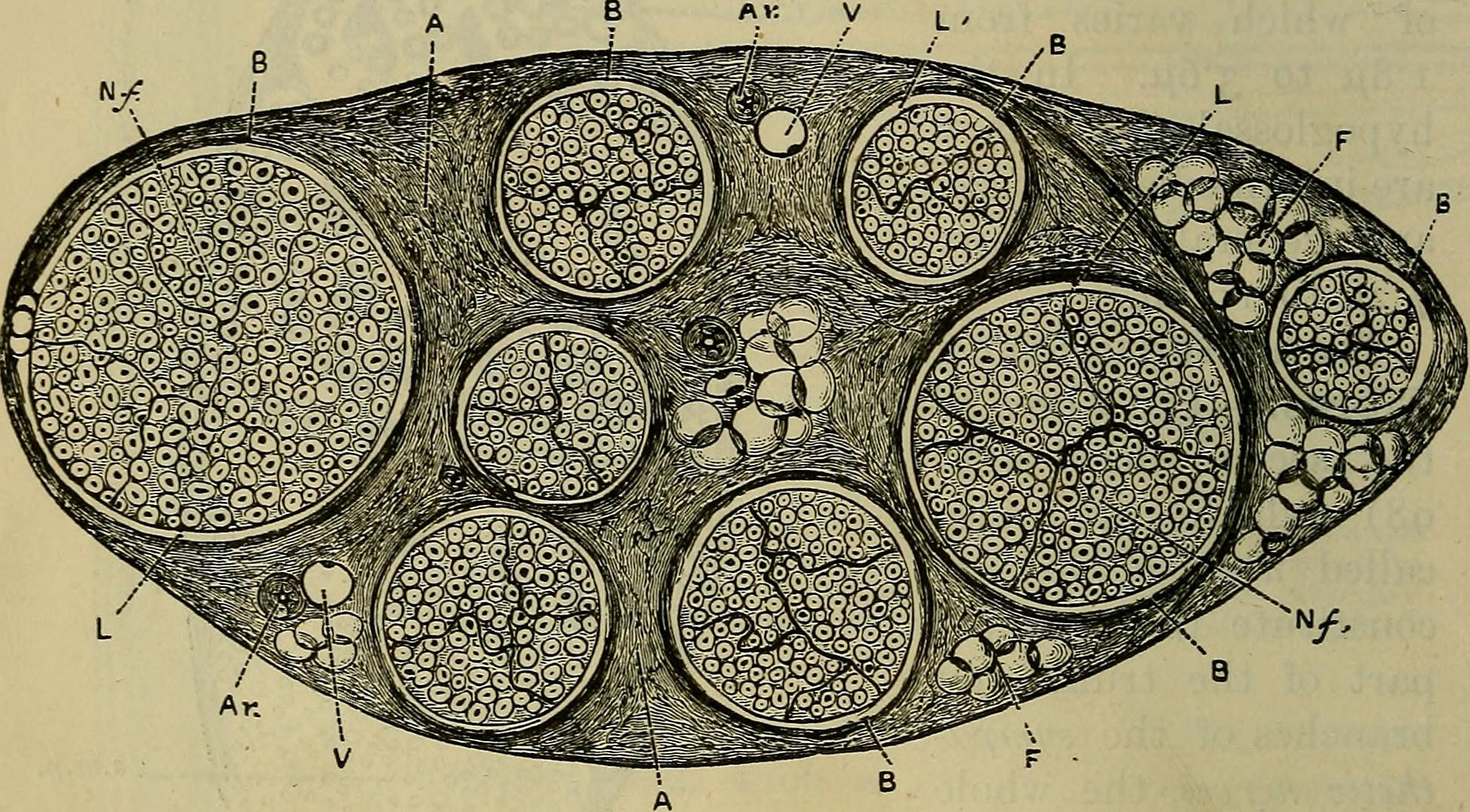
Motor nerves wrapped in endoneurium

== Spinal cord exit ==
Most motor pathways originate in the motor cortex of the brain. Signals run down the brainstem and spinal cord ipsilaterally, on the same side, and exit the spinal cord at the ventral horn of the spinal cord on either side. Motor nerves communicate with the muscle cells they innervate through motor neurons once they exit the brain or spinal cord.

== Motor nerve types ==
Motor nerves can vary based on the subtype of motor neuron they are associate with.

=== Alpha ===
Alpha motor neurons target extrafusal muscle fibers. The motor nerves associated with these neurons innervate extrafusal fibers and are responsible for muscle contraction. These nerve fibers have the largest diameter of the motor neurons and require the highest conduction velocity of the three types.

=== Beta ===
Beta motor neurons innervate intrafusal fibers of muscle spindles. These nerves are responsible for signaling slow twitch muscle fibers.

=== Gamma ===
Gamma motor neurons, unlike alpha motor neurons, are not directly involved in muscle contraction. The nerves associated with these neurons do not send signals that directly adjust the shortening or lengthening of muscle fibers. However, these nerves are important in keeping muscle spindles taut.

== Neurodegeneration ==
Motor neural degeneration is the progressive weakening of neural tissues and connections in the nervous system. Muscles begin to weaken as there are no longer any motor nerves or pathways that allows for muscle innervation. Motor neuron diseases can be viral, genetic or be a result of environmental factors. The exact causes remain unclear, however many experts believe that toxic and environmental factors play a large role.

== Neuroregeneration ==
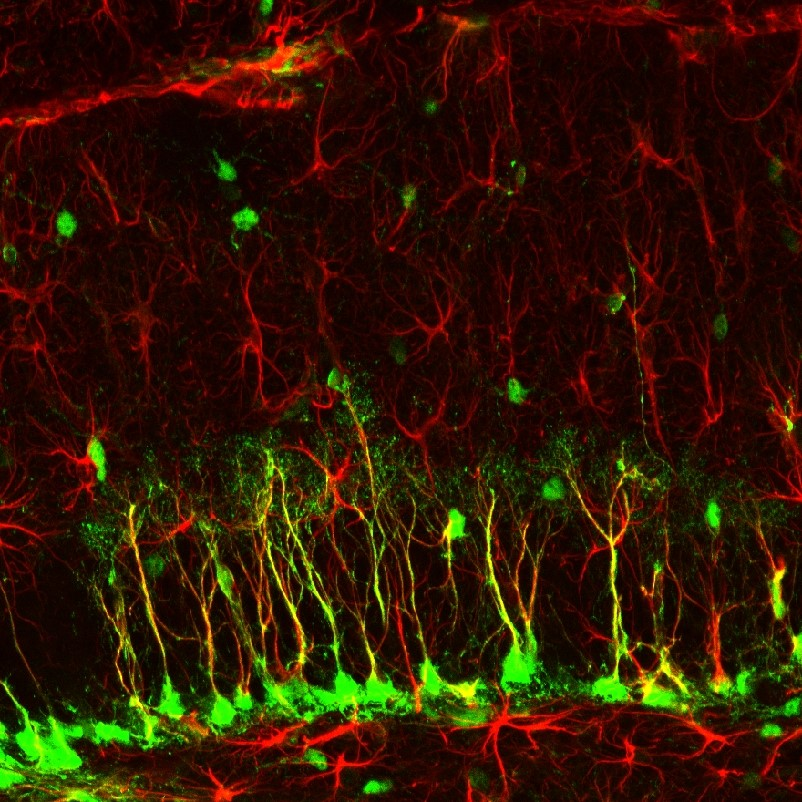
Neural stem cells seen in green

There are problems with neuroregeneration due to many sources, both internal and external. There is a weak regenerative ability of nerves and new nerve cells cannot simply be made. The outside environment can also play a role in nerve regeneration. Neural stem cells (NSCs), however, are able to differentiate into many different types of nerve cells. This is one way that nerves can "repair" themselves. NSC transplant into damaged areas usually leads to the cells differentiating into astrocytes which assists the surrounding neurons. Schwann cells have the ability to regenerate, but the capacity that these cells can repair nerve cells declines as time goes on as well as distance the Schwann cells are from site of damage.

== See also ==
- Sensory nerve
- Afferent nerve fiber
- Efferent nerve fiber
- Sensory neuron
- Motor neuron (efferent neurons )
