= Nerve conduction velocity =

Speed at which an electrochemical impulse propagates down a neural pathway

Saltatory conduction

In neuroscience, nerve conduction velocity (CV) is the speed at which an electrochemical impulse propagates down a neural pathway. Conduction velocities are affected by a wide array of factors, which include age, sex, and various medical conditions. Studies allow for better diagnoses of various neuropathies, especially demyelinating diseases as these conditions result in reduced or non-existent conduction velocities. CV is an important aspect of nerve conduction studies.

== Normal conduction velocities ==
Ultimately, conduction velocities are specific to each individual and depend largely on an axon's diameter and the degree to which that axon is myelinated, but the majority of 'normal' individuals fall within defined ranges.

Nerve impulses are extremely slow compared to the speed of electricity, where the electric field can propagate with a speed on the order of 50–99% of the speed of light; however, it is very fast compared to the speed of blood flow, with some myelinated neurons conducting at speeds up to 120 m/s (432 km/h or 275 mph). The speed of nerve impulse transmission ranges from about 0.5 m/s to over 120 m/s.

Motor fiber types
Type	Erlanger–Gasser classification	Diameter	Myelin	Conduction velocity	Associated muscle fibers
α	Aα	13–20 μm	Yes	50–60 m/s	Extrafusal muscle fibers
γ	Aγ	5–8 μm	Yes	4–24 m/s	Intrafusal muscle fibers

Different sensory receptors are innervated by different types of nerve fibers. Proprioceptors are innervated by type Ia, Ib and II sensory fibers, mechanoreceptors by type II and III sensory fibers, and nociceptors and thermoreceptors by type III and IV sensory fibers.

Sensory fiber types
Type	Erlanger–Gasser classification	Diameter	Myelin	Conduction velocity	Associated sensory receptors
Ia	Aα	13–20 μm	Yes	80–120 m/s	Responsible for proprioception
Ib	Aα	13–20 μm	Yes	80–120 m/s	Golgi tendon organ
II	Aβ	6–12 μm	Yes	33–75 m/s	Secondary receptors of muscle spindle All cutaneous mechanoreceptors
III	Aδ	1–5 μm	Thin	3–30 m/s	Free nerve endings of touch and pressure Nociceptors of neospinothalamic tract Cold thermoreceptors
IV	C	0.2–1.5 μm	No	0.5–2.0 m/s	Nociceptors of paleospinothalamic tract Warmth receptors

Autonomic efferent fibre types
Type	Erlanger–Gasser classification	Diameter	Myelin	Conduction velocity
preganglionic fibers	B	1–5 μm	Yes	3–15 m/s
postganglionic fibers	C	0.2–1.5 μm	No	0.5–2.0 m/s

Peripheral nerves
Nerve	Conduction velocity
Median sensory	45–70 m/s
Median motor	49–64 m/s
Ulnar sensory	48–74 m/s
Ulnar motor	49+ m/s
Peroneal motor	44+ m/s
Tibial motor	41+ m/s
Sural sensory	46–64 m/s

Normal impulses in peripheral nerves of the legs travel at 40–45 m/s, and those in peripheral nerves of the arms at 50–65 m/s. Largely generalized, normal conduction velocities for any given nerve will be in the range of 50–60 m/s.

== Testing methods ==
Calculation of NCV

=== Nerve conduction studies ===
Nerve conduction velocity is just one of many measurements commonly made during a nerve conduction study (NCS). The purpose of these studies is to determine whether nerve damage is present and how severe that damage may be.

Nerve conduction studies are performed as follows:

- Two electrodes are attached to the subject's skin over the nerve being tested.
- Electrical impulses are sent through one electrode to stimulate the nerve.
- The second electrode records the impulse sent through the nerve as a result of stimulation.
- The time difference between stimulation from the first electrode and pickup by the downstream electrode is known as the latency. Nerve conduction latencies are typically on the order of milliseconds.

Although conduction velocity itself is not directly measured, calculating conduction velocities from NCS measurements is trivial. The distance between the stimulating and receiving electrodes is divided by the impulse latency, resulting in conduction velocity. NCV = conduction distance / (proximal latency-distal latency)

Many times, Needle EMG is also performed on subjects at the same time as other NCS procedures because they aid in detecting whether muscles are functioning properly in response to stimuli sent via their connecting nerves. EMG is the most important component of electrodiagnosis of motor neuron diseases as it often leads to the identification of motor neuron involvement before clinical evidence can be seen.

==== Micromachined 3D electrode arrays ====
Typically, the electrodes used in an EMG are stuck to the skin over a thin layer of gel/paste. This allows for better conduction between electrode and skin. However, as these electrodes do not pierce the skin, there are impedances that result in erroneous readings, high noise levels, and low spatial resolution in readings.

To address these problems, new devices are being developed, such as 3-dimensional electrode arrays. These are MEMS devices that consist of arrays of metal micro-towers capable of penetrating the outer layers of skin, thus reducing impedance.

Compared with traditional wet electrodes, multi-electrode arrays offer the following:

- Electrodes are about 1/10 the size of standard wet surface electrodes
- Arrays of electrodes can be created and scaled to cover areas of almost any size
- Reduced impedance
- Improved signal power
- Higher amplitude signals
- Allow better real-time nerve impulse tracking

== Causes of conduction velocity deviations ==
=== Anthropometric and other individualized factors ===
Baseline nerve conduction measurements are different for everyone, as they are dependent upon the individual's age, sex, local temperatures, and other anthropometric factors such as hand size and height. It is important to understand the effect of these various factors on the normal values for nerve conduction measurements to aid in identifying abnormal nerve conduction study results. The ability to predict normal values in the context of an individual's anthropometric characteristics increases the sensitivities and specificities of electrodiagnostic procedures.

==== Age ====
Normal 'adult' values for conduction velocities are typically reached by age 4. Conduction velocities in newborns and toddlers tend to be about half the adult values.

Nerve conduction studies performed on healthy adults revealed that age is negatively associated with the sensory amplitude measures of the Median, Ulnar, and Sural nerves. Negative associations were also found between age and the conduction velocities and latencies in the Median sensory, Median motor, and Ulnar sensory nerves. However, conduction velocity of the Sural nerve is not associated with age. In general, conduction velocities in the upper extremities decrease by about 1 m/s for every 10 years of age.

==== Sex ====
Sural nerve conduction amplitude is significantly smaller in females than males, and the latency of impulses is longer in females, thus a slower conduction velocity.

Other nerves have not been shown to exhibit any gender biases.

==== Temperature ====
In general, the conduction velocities of most motor and sensory nerves are positively and linearly associated with body temperature (low temperatures slow nerve conduction velocity and higher temperatures increase conduction velocity).

Conduction velocities in the Sural nerve seem to exhibit an especially strong correlation with the local temperature of the nerve.

==== Height ====
Conduction velocities in both the Median sensory and Ulnar sensory nerves are negatively related to an individual's height, which likely accounts for the fact that, among most of the adult population, conduction velocities between the wrist and digits of an individual's hand decrease by 0.5 m/s for each inch increase in height. As a direct consequence, impulse latencies within the Median, Ulnar, and Sural nerves increases with height.

The correlation between height and the amplitude of impulses in the sensory nerves is negative.

==== Hand factors ====
Circumference of the index finger appears to be negatively associated with conduction amplitudes in the Median and Ulnar nerves. In addition, people with larger wrist ratios (anterior-posterior diameter : medial-lateral diameter) have lower Median nerve latencies and faster conduction velocities.

=== Medical conditions ===
==== Amyotrophic lateral sclerosis (ALS) ====
Amyotrophic lateral sclerosis is a progressive and inevitably fatal neurodegenerative disease affecting the motor neurons. Because ALS shares many symptoms with other neurodegenerative diseases, it can be difficult to diagnose properly. The best method of establishing a confident diagnosis is via electrodiagnostic evaluation. To be specific, motor nerve conduction studies of the Median, Ulnar, and peroneal muscles should be performed, as well as sensory nerve conduction studies of the Ulnar and Sural nerves.

In patients with ALS, it has been shown that distal motor latencies and slowing of conduction velocity worsened as the severity of their muscle weakness increased. Both symptoms are consistent with the axonal degeneration occurring in ALS patients.

==== Carpal tunnel syndrome ====
Carpal tunnel syndrome (CTS) is a form of nerve compression syndrome caused by the compression of the median nerve at the wrist. Typical symptoms include numbness, tingling, burning pains, or weakness in the hand. CTS is another condition for which electrodiagnostic testing is valuable. However, before subjecting a patient to nerve conduction studies, both Tinel's test and Phalen's test should be performed. If both results are negative, it is very unlikely that the patient has CTS, and further testing is unnecessary.

Carpal tunnel syndrome presents in each individual to different extents. Measurements of nerve conduction velocity are critical to determining the degree of severity. These levels of severity are categorized as:

- Mild CTS: Prolonged sensory latencies, very slight decrease in conduction velocity. No suspected axonal degeneration.
- Moderate CTS: Abnormal sensory conduction velocities and reduced motor conduction velocities. No suspected axonal degeneration.
- Severe CTS: Absence of sensory responses and prolonged motor latencies (reduced motor conduction velocities)
- Extreme CTS: Absence of both sensory and motor responses

One common electrodiagnostic measurement includes the difference between sensory nerve conduction velocities in the pinkie finger and index finger. In most instances of CTS, symptoms will not present until this difference is greater than 8 m/s.

==== Guillain–Barré syndrome ====
Guillain–Barré syndrome (GBS) is a peripheral neuropathy involving the degeneration of myelin sheathing and/or nerves that innervate the head, body, and limbs. This degeneration is due to an autoimmune response typically initiated by various infections.

Two primary classifications exist: demyelinating (Schwann cell damage) and axonal (direct nerve fiber damage). Each of these then branches into additional sub-classifications depending on the exact manifestation. In all cases, however, the condition results in weakness or paralysis of limbs, the potentially fatal paralysis of respiratory muscles, or a combination of these effects.

The disease can progress very rapidly once symptoms present (severe damage can occur within as little as a day). Because electrodiagnosis is one of the fastest and most direct methods of determining the presence of the illness and its proper classification, nerve conduction studies are extremely important. Without proper electrodiagnostic assessment, GBS is commonly misdiagnosed as polio, West Nile virus, tick paralysis, various toxic neuropathies, CIDP, transverse myelitis, or hysterical paralysis. Two sets of nerve conduction studies should allow for proper diagnosis of Guillain–Barré syndrome. It is recommended that these be performed within the first 2 weeks of symptom presentation and again sometime between 3 and 8 weeks.

Electrodiagnostic findings that may implicate GBS include:

- Complete conduction blocks
- Abnormal or absent F waves
- Attenuated compound muscle action potential amplitudes
- Prolonged motor neuron latencies
- Severely slowed conduction velocities (sometimes below 20 m/s)

==== Lambert–Eaton myasthenic syndrome ====
Lambert–Eaton myasthenic syndrome (LEMS) is an autoimmune disease in which auto-antibodies are directed against voltage-gated calcium channels at presynaptic nerve terminals. Here, the antibodies inhibit the release of neurotransmitters, resulting in muscle weakness and autonomic dysfunctions.

Nerve conduction studies performed on the Ulnar motor and sensory, Median motor and sensory, Tibial motor, and Peroneal motor nerves in patients with LEMS have shown that the conduction velocity across these nerves is actually normal. However, the amplitudes of the compound motor action potentials may be reduced by up to 55%, and the duration of these action potentials decreased by up to 47%.

==== Peripheral diabetic neuropathy ====
At least half the population with diabetes mellitus is also affected with diabetic neuropathy, causing numbness and weakness in the peripheral limbs. Studies have shown that the Rho/Rho-kinase signaling pathway is more active in individuals with diabetes and that this signaling activity occurs mainly in the nodes of Ranvier and Schmidt-Lanterman incisures. Therefore, over-activity of the Rho/Rho-kinase signaling pathway may inhibit nerve conduction.

Motor nerve conduction velocity studies revealed that conductance in diabetic rats was about 30% lower than that of the non-diabetic control group. In addition, activity along the Schmidt-Lanterman incisures was non-continuous and non-linear in the diabetic group, but linear and continuous in the control. These deficiencies were eliminated after the administration of Fasudil to the diabetic group, implying that it may be a potential treatment.

== See also ==
- Nerve conduction study
- Electrodiagnosis
- Electromyography
