= Lower motor neuron =

Control effector organs, mainly muscles and glands

Identifiers
- FMA: 84632

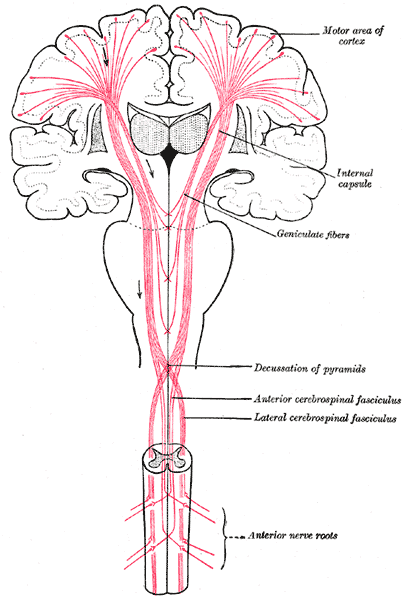
The motor tract

Lower motor neurons (LMNs) are motor neurons located in either the anterior grey column, anterior nerve roots (spinal lower motor neurons) or the cranial nerve nuclei of the brainstem and cranial nerves with motor function (cranial nerve lower motor neurons). Many voluntary movements rely on spinal lower motor neurons, which innervate skeletal muscle fibers and act as a link between upper motor neurons and muscles. Cranial nerve lower motor neurons also control some voluntary movements of the eyes, face and tongue, and contribute to chewing, swallowing and vocalization. Damage to lower motor neurons often leads to hypotonia, hyporeflexia, flaccid paralysis as well as muscle atrophy and fasciculations.

== Classification ==
Lower motor neurons are classified based on the type of muscle fiber they innervate:

- Alpha motor neurons (α-MNs) innervate extrafusal muscle fibers, the most numerous type of muscle fiber and the one involved in muscle contraction.
- Beta motor neurons (β-MNs) innervate intrafusal fibers of muscle spindles with collaterals to extrafusal fibers (type of slow twitch fibers).
- Gamma motor neurons (γ-MNs) innervate intrafusal muscle fibers, which together with sensory afferents compose muscle spindles. These are part of the system for sensing body position (proprioception).

== Physiology ==
Glutamate released from the upper motor neurons triggers depolarization in the lower motor neurons in the anterior grey column, which in turn causes an action potential to propagate the length of the axon to the neuromuscular junction where acetylcholine is released to carry the signal across the synaptic cleft to the postsynaptic receptors of the muscle cell membrane, signaling the muscle to contract.

== Clinical significance ==
Damage to lower motor neurons, lower motor neuron lesions (LMNL) cause muscle wasting (atrophy), decreased strength and decreased reflexes in affected areas. These findings are in contrast to findings in upper motor neuron lesions. LMNL is indicated by abnormal EMG potentials, fasciculations, paralysis, weakening of muscles, and neurogenic atrophy of skeletal muscle. Bell's palsy, bulbar palsy, poliomyelitis and amyotrophic lateral sclerosis (ALS) are all pathologies associated with lower motor neuron dysfunction.

== See also ==
- Upper motor neuron
- Upper motor neuron lesion
- Motor system
