= Secondary sensory endings =

Within the sensory nervous system, Secondary sensory endings of the muscle spindle are composed of type II sensory fibers that terminate on nuclear chain fibers and static nuclear bag fibers, but not dynamic nuclear bag fibers. Whereas primary endings respond mostly to rate of change, secondary endings respond mostly to amount of stretch.
