= Efferent nerve fiber =

Axonal projections that exit a particular region

- In the peripheral nervous system, afferent and efferent projections are always from the perspective of the spinal cord.

Details
- System: Peripheral nervous system

Identifiers
- Latin: neurofibrae efferentes
- TA98: A14.2.00.018
- TH: H2.00.06.1.00016
- FMA: 76571

Efferent nerve fibers are axons (nerve fibers) of efferent neurons that exit a particular region. These terms have a slightly different meaning in the context of the peripheral nervous system (PNS) and central nervous system (CNS). The efferent fiber is a long process projecting far from the neuron's body that carries nerve impulses away from the central nervous system toward the peripheral effector organs (muscles and glands). A bundle of these fibers constitute an efferent nerve. The opposite direction of neural activity is afferent conduction, which carries impulses by way of the afferent nerve fibers of sensory neurons.

In the nervous system, there is a "closed loop" system of sensation, decision, and reactions. This process is carried out through the activity of sensory neurons, interneurons, and motor neurons.

In the CNS, afferent and efferent projections can be from the perspective of any given brain region. That is, each brain region has its own unique set of afferent and efferent projections. In the context of a given brain region, afferents are arriving fibers while efferents are exiting fibers.

== Structure ==
=== Motor nerve ===
Myelinated GS efferent fiber leaving cell body of motor neuron to form a neuromuscular junction

The efferent nerve fibers of motor neurons are involved in muscle control, both skeletal and smooth muscle. The cell body of the motor neuron is connected to a single, long axon and several shorter dendrites projecting out of the cell body itself. This axon then forms a neuromuscular junction with the effectors. The cell body of the motor neuron is satellite-shaped. The motor neuron is present in the grey matter of the spinal cord and medulla oblongata, and forms an electrochemical pathway to the effector organ or muscle.

=== Types ===
There are three types of efferent fibers: general somatic efferent fibers (GSE), general visceral efferent fibers (GVE) and special visceral efferent fibers (SVE).

Subtypes of general somatic efferent fibers include: alpha motor neurons (α) – these target extrafusal muscle fibers, and gamma motor neurons (γ) that target intrafusal muscle fibers. Beta motor neurons target both types of muscle fiber and there are two types known as static and dynamic.

Alpha motor neurons are large lower motor neurons located in the anterior (ventral) horn of the spinal cord, and they serve as the final common pathway for producing skeletal muscle movement. Their axons exit through the ventral roots and innervate extrafusal muscle fibers, the main contractile fibers responsible for generating force. When activated, alpha motor neurons release acetylcholine at the neuromuscular junction, triggering depolarization and contraction of the muscle. They receive input from multiple sources, including upper motor neurons from the corticospinal tract, sensory afferents from muscle spindles (especially Ia fibers involved in the stretch reflex), spinal interneurons, and motor control centers such as the cerebellum and basal ganglia. Alpha motor neurons play a central role in voluntary movement, reflexes, muscle tone, and posture. Damage to these neurons results in classic lower motor neuron signs, such as muscle weakness, flaccid paralysis, fasciculations, decreased tone, and atrophy, seen in conditions like poliomyelitis, ALS, and spinal muscular atrophy. They work alongside gamma motor neurons, which adjust spindle sensitivity, but alpha motor neurons are primarily responsible for producing actual muscle force and movement.

== Etymology and mnemonics ==
Both afferent and efferent come from French, evolved from Latin (the basis of many terms in medicine and biology) for the terms, respectively, ad ferens (Latin verb ferre: carry), meaning carrying into, and ex ferens, meaning carrying away (ad literally means to, and e = ex means from). Ad and ex give an easy mnemonic device for remembering the relationship between afferent and efferent: afferent connection arrives and an efferent connection exits.

Afferent and efferent are connected to affect and effect through their common Latin roots: Afferent nerves affect the subject, whereas efferent nerves allow the subject to effect change.

== See also ==
- Sensory nerve
- Motor nerve
- Afferent nerve fiber
- Sensory neuron
- Motor neuron (efferent neuron)
