= Nociceptor =

Sensory neuron that detects pain

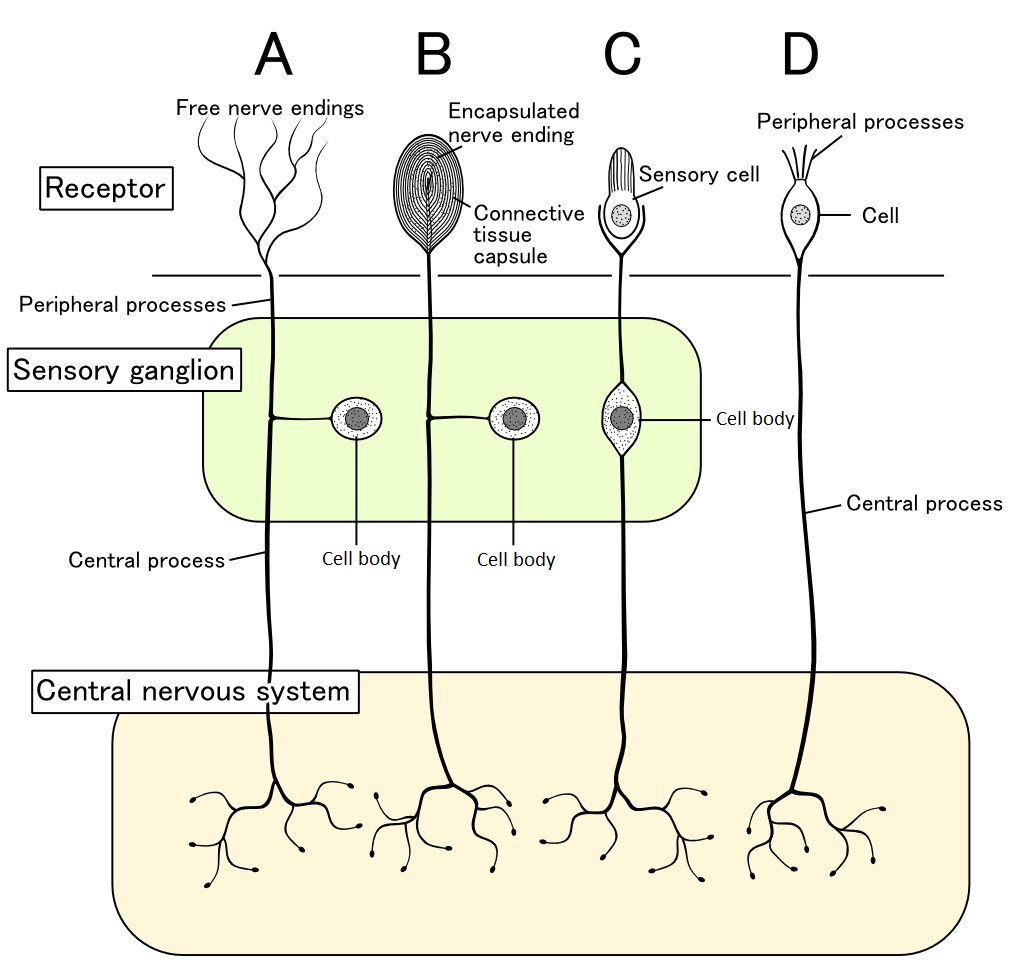
- Four types of sensory neurons and their receptor cells. Nociceptors shown as free nerve endings type A

Identifiers
- MeSH: D009619

A nociceptor (from Latin nocere 'to harm or hurt') is a sensory neuron that responds to damaging or potentially damaging stimuli by sending "possible threat" signals to the spinal cord and the brain. The brain creates the sensation of pain to direct attention to the body part, so the threat can be mitigated; this process is called nociception.

== Terminology ==
Nociception and pain are usually evoked only by pressures and temperatures that are potentially damaging to tissues. This barrier or threshold contrasts with the more sensitive visual, auditory, olfactory, taste, and somatosensory responses to stimuli. The experience of pain is individualistic and can be suppressed by stress or exacerbated by anticipation. Simple activation of a nociceptor does not always lead to perceived pain, because the latter also depends on the frequency of the action potentials, integration of pre- and postsynaptic signals, and influences from higher or central processes.

Nociceptors in peripheral tissues detect potentially harmful stimuli and send signals through peripheral nerves to the spinal cord, which conveys the information to the thalamus and then to the somatosensory cortex, where the location and intensity of pain are processed. The insular cortex, another key region in pain processing networks, is involved in integrating sensory and emotional aspects of pain, and studies have reported disrupted function and reduced gray matter volume in this area among individuals with chronic pain.

== History ==
Nociceptors were discovered by Charles Scott Sherrington in 1906. In earlier centuries, scientists believed that animals were like mechanical devices that transformed the energy of sensory stimuli into motor responses. Sherrington's experiments demonstrated that different types of stimulation to an afferent nerve fiber's receptive field led to different responses. Some intense stimuli trigger reflex withdrawal, certain autonomic responses, and pain. The receptors for these stimuli were called nociceptors.

Studies of nociceptors have been conducted on conscious humans as well as surrogate animal models. The process was complicated by the use of invasive methods that could change the nociceptors activity, the inability to record from small neuronal structures, and uncertainties in animal model systems as to whether a response should be attributed to pain or some other factor.

== Location ==
In mammals, nociceptors are found in any area of the body that can sense noxious stimuli. External nociceptors are found in tissue such as the skin (cutaneous nociceptors), the corneas, and the mucosa. Internal nociceptors are found in a variety of organs, such as the muscles, the joints, the bladder, the visceral organs, and the digestive tract. The cell bodies of these neurons are located in either the dorsal root ganglia or the trigeminal ganglia. The trigeminal ganglia are specialized nerves for the face, whereas the dorsal root ganglia are associated with the rest of the body. The axons extend into the peripheral nervous system and terminate in branches to form receptive fields.

== Types and functions ==
Nociceptors are usually electrically silent when not stimulated. The peripheral terminal of the mature nociceptor is where the noxious stimuli are detected and transduced into electrical energy. When the electrical energy reaches a threshold value, an action potential is induced and driven towards the central nervous system (CNS). This leads to the train of events that allows for the conscious awareness of pain. The sensory specificity of nociceptors is established by the high threshold only to particular features of stimuli. Only when the threshold has been reached are the nociceptors triggered.

In terms of conduction velocity, nociceptors come in two groups. Aδ fiber axons are myelinated and can allow an action potential to travel towards the CNS at speeds from 5 to 30 meters/second. The C fiber axons conduct more slowly at speeds from 0.4 to 2 meters/second due to their smaller diameters and little or no myelination. As a result, pain comes in two phases: an initial extremely sharp pain associated with the Aδ fibers and a second, more prolonged and slightly less intense feeling of pain from the C fibers. Massive or prolonged input to a C fiber results in a progressive build up in the dorsal horn of the spinal cord; this phenomenon called wind-up is similar to tetanus in muscles. Wind-up increases the probability of greater sensitivity to pain.

=== Thermal ===
Thermal nociceptors are activated by noxious heat or cold at various temperatures. Specific nociceptor transducers are responsible for how and whether the specific nerve ending responds to the thermal stimulus. The first to be discovered was TRPV1, which has a threshold that matches the heat pain temperature of 43 °C. Other temperature in the warm–hot range is mediated by more than one TRP channel. Each channel expresses a particular C-terminal domain that corresponds to the warm–hot sensitivity. The interactions between all these channels and how the temperature level is determined to be above the pain threshold are unknown. Cool stimuli are sensed by TRPM8 channels that have a different C-terminal domain than the heat sensitive TRPs. Although this channel responds to cool stimuli, whether it also contributes in the detection of intense cold is unresolved. An interesting finding related to cold stimuli is that tactile sensibility and motor function deteriorate while pain perception persists.

=== Mechanical ===
Mechanical nociceptors respond to pressure or mechanical deformation and to incisions that break the skin. The reaction to the stimulus is processed as pain by the cortex. Many nociceptors have polymodal characteristics, so it is possible that some of the transducers for thermal stimuli are the same for mechanical stimuli. The same is true for chemical stimuli, since TRPA1 appears to detect both mechanical and chemical changes. Some mechanical stimuli can cause release of intermediate chemicals, such as ATP, which can be detected by P2 purinergic receptors, or nerve growth factor, which in turn can be detected by tropomyosin receptor kinase A (TrkA).

=== Chemical ===
Chemical nociceptors have TRP channels that respond to a wide variety of spices. The one that sees the most response and is very widely tested is capsaicin. Other chemical stimulants are environmental irritants like acrolein, a World War I chemical weapon and a component of cigarette smoke. Apart from these external stimulants, chemical nociceptors have the capacity to detect endogenous ligands, and certain fatty acid amines that arise from changes in internal tissues. As in thermal nociceptors, TRPV1 can detect chemicals like capsaicin and spider toxins and acids. Acid-sensing ion channels (ASIC) also detect acidity.

=== Sleeping/silent ===
Although each nociceptor can have a variety of possible threshold levels, some do not respond at all to chemical, thermal or mechanical stimuli absent injury. These are typically referred to as silent or sleeping nociceptors since their response comes only on the onset of inflammation to the surrounding tissue. They were identified using electrical stimulation of their receptive field.

=== Polymodal ===
Polymodal nociceptors respond to more than one type of stimuli. They are the most common type of C-fiber nociceptors and release a rich repertoire of neurotransmitters.

Polymodal nociceptors are unmyelinated that specialized C fiber to response to mechanical, thermal, and chemical noxious stimuli through ion channels such as Transient Receptor Potential Vanilloid 1 (TRPV1), Transient Receptor Potential Ankyrin 1 (TRPA1), and acid-sensing ion channels (ASICs). When these nociceptors are triggered, they release neurotransmitters including substance P and calcitonin gene-related peptide (CGRP), which provides important role in neurogenic inflammation and facilitate nociceptive communication within the spinal cord. Their ability to react to multiple stimulus types in acute and chronic pain mechanisms.

== Pathways ==
Nociceptive pain pathways involve the transmission of sensory information from peripheral nociceptors of C-fibers to the dorsal horn of the spinal cord. These synaptic signals are transmitted to second-order neurons in laminae I and II, which serve as initiation sites for nociceptive information entering the central nervous system. These neurons play a crucial role in regulating the degree of pain transmission that crosses to the contralateral side and ascends to the primary tract, where the spinothalamic and spinoreticular pathways are. These ascending spinal cord pathways convey and localize nociceptive pain information from the periphery (body) to the brainstem. From the thalamus, these pathways continue to the brain regions such as the somatosensory cortex, insula, and anterior cingulate cortex, where the physical, emotional, and cognitive dimensions of pain are processed.

=== Ascending ===
Afferent nociceptive fibers (those that send information to, rather than from the brain) travel back to the spinal cord where they form synapses in its dorsal horn. This nociceptive fiber (located in the periphery) is a first order neuron. The cells in the dorsal horn are divided into physiologically distinct layers called laminae. Different fiber types form synapses in different layers, and use either glutamate or substance P as the neurotransmitter. Aδ fibers form synapses in laminae I and V, C fibers connect with neurons in lamina II, Aβ fibers connect with lamina I, III, & V. After reaching the specific lamina within the spinal cord, the first order nociceptive project to second order neurons that cross the midline at the anterior white commissure. The second order neurons then send their information via two pathways to the thalamus: the dorsal column medial-lemniscal system and the anterolateral system. The former is reserved more for regular non-painful sensation, while the latter is reserved for pain sensation. Upon reaching the thalamus, the information is processed in the ventral posterior nucleus and sent to the cerebral cortex in the brain via fibers in the posterior limb of the internal capsule.

=== Descending ===
The brain can request the release of specific hormones or chemicals that can have analgesic effects which can reduce or inhibit pain sensation. The area of the brain that stimulates the release of these hormones is the hypothalamus. This effect of descending inhibition can be shown by electrically stimulating the periaqueductal grey area of the midbrain or the periventricular nucleus. They both in turn project to other areas involved in pain regulation, such as the nucleus raphe magnus which also receives similar afferents from the nucleus reticularis paragigantocellularis (NPG). In turn the nucleus raphe magnus projects to the substantia gelatinosa region of the dorsal horn and mediates the sensation of spinothalamic inputs. This is done first by the nucleus raphe magnus sending serotonergic neurons to neurons in the dorsal cord, that in turn secrete enkephalin to the interneurons that carry pain perception. Enkephalin functions by binding opioid receptors to cause inhibition of the post-synaptic neuron, thus inhibiting pain. The periaqueductal grey also contains opioid receptors which explains one of the mechanisms by which opioids such as morphine and diacetylmorphine exhibit an analgesic effect.

== Sensitivity ==
Nociceptor sensitivity is modulated by a large variety of mediators in the extracellular space, such as toxic and inflammatory molecules. Peripheral sensitization represents a form of functional plasticity of the nociceptor. The nociceptor can change from being simply a noxious stimulus detector to a detector of non-noxious stimuli. The result is that low intensity stimuli from regular activity initiates a painful sensation. This is commonly known as hyperalgesia. Inflammation is one common cause that results in the sensitization of nociceptors. Normally hyperalgesia ceases when inflammation goes down, however, sometimes genetic defects and/or repeated injury can result in allodynia: a completely non-noxious stimulus like light touch causes extreme pain. Allodynia can also be caused when a nociceptor is damaged in the peripheral nerves. This can result in deafferentation, which means the development of different central processes from the surviving afferent nerve. With this situation, surviving dorsal root axons of the nociceptors can make contact with the spinal cord, thus changing the normal input.

== Neural development ==
Nociceptors develop from neural-crest stem cells during embryogenesis. The neural crest is responsible for a large part of early development in vertebrates. It is specifically responsible for development of the peripheral nervous system (PNS). The neural-crest stem cells split from the neural tube as it closes, and nociceptors grow from the dorsal part of this neural-crest tissue. They form late during neurogenesis. Earlier forming cells from this region can become non-pain sensing receptors, either proprioceptors or low-threshold mechanoreceptors. All neurons derived from the neural crest, including embryonic nociceptors, express the tropomyosin receptor kinase A (TrkA), which is a receptor to nerve growth factor (NGF). However, transcription factors that determine the type of nociceptor remain unclear.

Following sensory neurogenesis, differentiation occurs, and two types of nociceptors are formed. They are classified as either peptidergic or nonpeptidergic nociceptors, each of which express a distinct repertoire of ion channels and receptors. Their specializations allow the receptors to innervate different central and peripheral targets. This differentiation occurs in both perinatal and postnatal periods. The nonpeptidergic nociceptors switch off the TrkA and begin expressing RET proto-oncogene, which is a transmembrane signaling component that allows the expression of glial cell line-derived neurotrophic factor (GDNF). This transition is assisted by runt-related transcription factor 1 (RUNX1) which is vital in the development of nonpeptidergic nociceptors. On the contrary, the peptidergic nociceptors continue to use TrkA, and they express a completely different type of growth factor. There currently is a lot of research about the differences between nociceptors.

== In other animals ==
Nociception has been documented in non-mammalian animals, including fish and a wide range of invertebrates, including leeches, nematode worms, sea slugs, and larval fruit flies. Although these neurons may have pathways and relationships to the central nervous system that are different from those of mammalian nociceptors, nociceptive neurons in non-mammals often fire in response to similar stimuli as mammals, such as high temperature (40 degrees C or more), low pH, capsaicin, and tissue damage.

For example, in fruit flies, specific multidendritic sensory neurons play a role in nociception. In mollusks, nociceptive responses are mediated by pedal sensory neurons. Crustaceans, on the other hand, utilize a variety of sensory cell types, including chordotonal organs and mechanoreceptors, to detect potentially damaging stimuli (see also Pain in crustaceans).

== See also ==
- Capsaicin and its mechanism of action in nociceptors
- Nociceptin and nociceptin receptor
- Piperine from black pepper
- TRPC ion channel
