= Motor neuron =

Nerve cell sending impulse to muscle

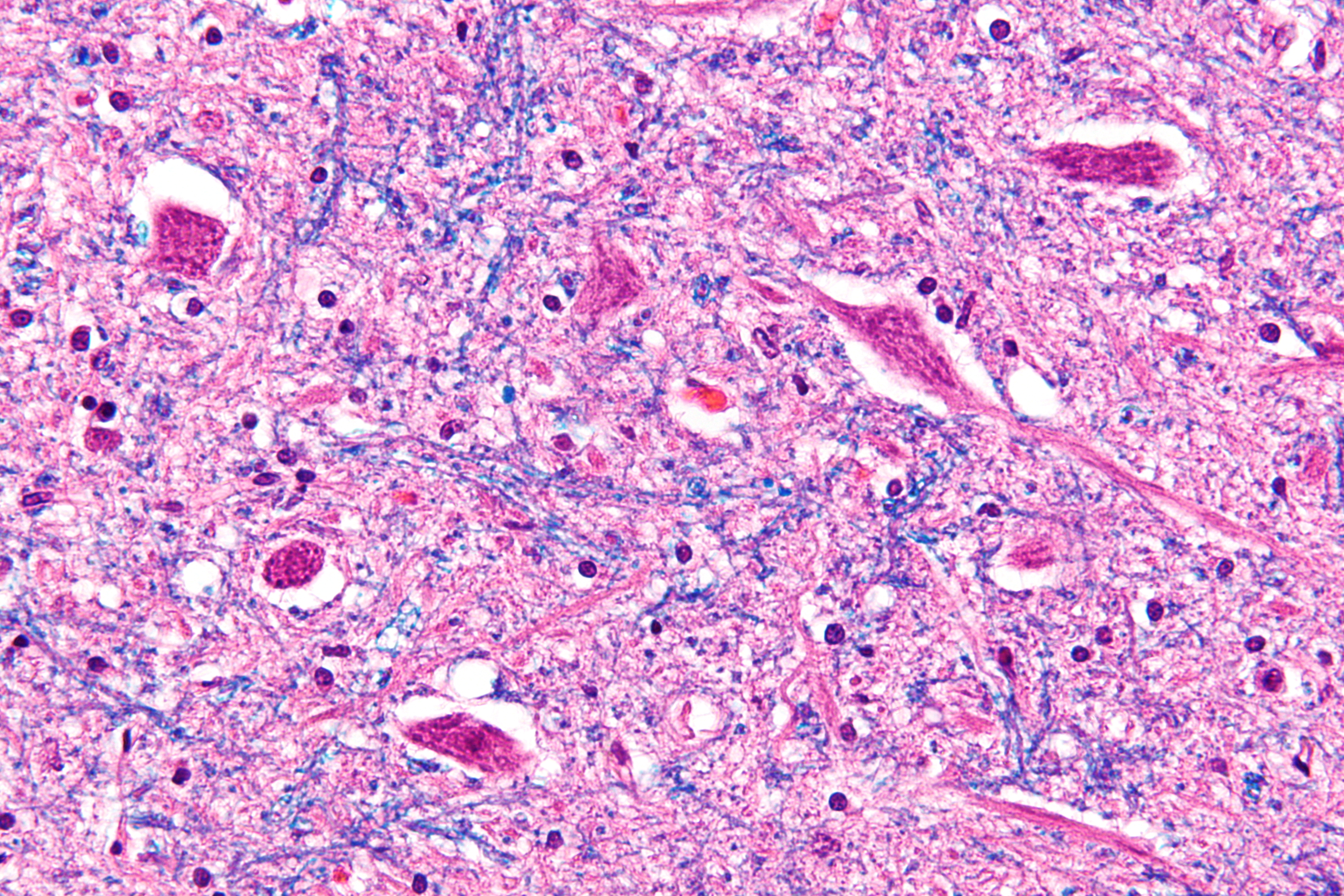
- Micrograph of the hypoglossal nucleus showing motor neurons with their characteristic coarse Nissl substance ("tigroid" cytoplasm). H&E-LFB stain.

Details
- Location: Ventral horn of the spinal cord, some cranial nerve nuclei
- Shape: Projection neuron
- Function: Excitatory projection (to [
- Neurotransmitter: UMN to LMN: glutamate; LMN to NMJ: ACh
- Presynaptic connections: Primary motor cortex via the Corticospinal tract
- Postsynaptic connections: Muscle fibers and other neurons

Identifiers
- MeSH: D009046
- NeuroLex ID: nifext_103
- TA98: A14.2.00.021
- TA2: 6131
- FMA: 83617

A motor neuron (or motoneuron), also known as efferent neuron is a neuron that allows for both voluntary and involuntary movements of the body through muscles and glands. Its cell body is located in the motor cortex, brainstem or the spinal cord, and its axon (fiber) projects to the spinal cord or outside of the spinal cord to directly or indirectly control effector organs, mainly muscles and glands. There are two types of motor neuron—upper motor neurons and lower motor neurons. Axons from upper motor neurons synapse onto interneurons in the spinal cord and occasionally directly onto lower motor neurons. The axons from the lower motor neurons are efferent nerve fibers that carry signals from the spinal cord to the effectors. Types of lower motor neurons are alpha motor neurons, beta motor neurons, and gamma motor neurons.

A single motor neuron may innervate many muscle fibres and a muscle fibre can undergo many action potentials in the time taken for a single muscle twitch. Innervation takes place at a neuromuscular junction and twitches can become superimposed as a result of summation or a tetanic contraction. Individual twitches can become indistinguishable, and tension rises smoothly eventually reaching a plateau.

Although the word "motor neuron" suggests that there is a single kind of neuron that controls movement, this is not the case. Indeed, upper and lower motor neurons—which differ greatly in their origins, synapse locations, routes, neurotransmitters, and lesion characteristics—are included in the same classification as "motor neurons". Essentially, motor neurons, also known as motoneurons, are made up of a variety of intricate, finely tuned circuits found throughout the body that innervate effector muscles and glands to enable both voluntary and involuntary motions. Two motor neurons come together to form a two-neuron circuit. While lower motor neurons start in the spinal cord and go to innervate muscles and glands all throughout the body, upper motor neurons originate in the cerebral cortex and travel to the brain stem or spinal cord. The distinctions between upper and lower motor neurons and the routes they follow are important factors in the effective detection of neuronal injuries and localisation of lesions.

Disorders causing selective injury to motor neurons are classified as motor neuron diseases.

== Development ==
A type of nerve cell that controls muscle movement by relaying signals from the spinal cord and brain

Motor neurons begin to develop early in [[embryogenesis|embryonic development]], and motor function continues to develop well into childhood. In the neural tube cells are specified to either the rostral-caudal axis or ventral-dorsal axis. The axons of motor neurons begin to appear in the fourth week of development from the ventral region of the ventral-dorsal axis (the basal plate). This homeodomain is known as the motor neural progenitor domain (pMN). Transcription factors here include Pax6, OLIG2, Nkx-6.1, and Nkx-6.2, which are regulated by sonic hedgehog (Shh). The OLIG2 gene is the most important due to its role in promoting Ngn2 expression, a gene that causes cell cycle exiting as well as promoting further transcription factors associated with motor neuron development.

Further specification of motor neurons occurs when retinoic acid, fibroblast growth factor, Wnts, and TGFb, are integrated into the various Hox transcription factors. There are 13 Hox transcription factors and along with the signals, determine whether a motor neuron will be more rostral or caudal in character. In the spinal column, Hox 4-11 sort motor neurons to one of the five motor columns.

Motor columns of spinal cord
Motor column	Location in spinal cord	Target
Median motor column	Present entire length	Axial muscles
Hypaxial motor column	Thoracic region	Body wall muscles
Preganglionic motor column	Thoracic region	Sympathetic ganglion
Lateral motor column	Brachial and lumbar region (both regions are further divided into medial and lateral domains)	Muscles of the limbs
Phrenic motor column	Cervical region	Diaphragm

== Anatomy and physiology ==
Spinal cord tracts

Location of lower motor neurons in spinal cord

=== Upper motor neurons ===
Upper motor neurons originate in the motor cortex located in the precentral gyrus. The cells that make up the primary motor cortex are Betz cells, which are giant pyramidal cells. The axons of these cells descend from the cortex to form the corticospinal tract. Corticomotorneurons project from the primary cortex directly onto motor neurons in the ventral horn of the spinal cord. Their axons synapse on the spinal motor neurons of multiple muscles as well as on spinal interneurons. They are unique to primates and it has been suggested that their function is the adaptive control of the hands including the relatively independent control of individual fingers. Corticomotorneurons have so far only been found in the primary motor cortex and not in secondary motor areas.

=== Nerve tracts ===
Nerve tracts are bundles of axons as white matter, that carry action potentials to their effectors. In the spinal cord these descending tracts carry impulses from different regions. These tracts also serve as the place of origin for lower motor neurons. There are seven major descending motor tracts to be found in the spinal cord:

- Lateral corticospinal tract
- Rubrospinal tract
- Lateral reticulospinal tract
- Vestibulospinal tract
- Medial reticulospinal tract
- Tectospinal tract
- Anterior corticospinal tract

=== Lower motor neurons ===
Lower motor neurons are those that originate in the spinal cord and directly or indirectly innervate effector targets. The target of these neurons varies, but in the somatic nervous system the target will be some sort of muscle fiber. There are three primary categories of lower motor neurons, which can be further divided in sub-categories.

According to their targets, motor neurons are classified into three broad categories:

- Somatic motor neurons
- Special visceral motor neurons
- General visceral motor neurons

==== Somatic motor neurons ====
Somatic motor neurons originate in the central nervous system, project their axons to skeletal muscles (such as the muscles of the limbs, abdominal, and intercostal muscles), which are involved in locomotion. The three types of these neurons are the alpha efferent neurons, beta efferent neurons, and gamma efferent neurons. They are called efferent to indicate the flow of information from the central nervous system (CNS) to the periphery.

- Alpha motor neurons innervate extrafusal muscle fibers, which are the main force-generating component of a muscle. Their cell bodies are in the ventral horn of the spinal cord and they are sometimes called ventral horn cells. A single motor neuron may synapse with 150 muscle fibers on average. The motor neuron and all of the muscle fibers to which it connects form a motor unit. Motor units are split up into three categories:
  - Slow (S) motor units stimulate small muscle fibers, which contract very slowly and provide small amounts of energy but are very resistant to fatigue, so they are used to sustain muscular contraction, such as keeping the body upright. They gain their energy via oxidative means and hence require oxygen. They are also called red fibers.
  - Fast fatiguing (FF) motor units stimulate larger muscle groups, which apply large amounts of force but fatigue very quickly. They are used for tasks that require large brief bursts of energy, such as jumping or running. They gain their energy via glycolytic means and hence do not require oxygen. They are called white fibers.
  - Fast fatigue-resistant motor units stimulate moderate-sized muscle groups that do not react as fast as the FF motor units, but can be sustained much longer (as implied by the name) and provide more force than S motor units. These use both oxidative and glycolytic means to gain energy.

In addition to voluntary skeletal muscle contraction, alpha motor neurons also contribute to muscle tone, the continuous force generated by noncontracting muscle to oppose stretching. When a muscle is stretched, sensory neurons within the muscle spindle detect the degree of stretch and send a signal to the CNS. The CNS activates alpha motor neurons in the spinal cord, which cause extrafusal muscle fibers to contract and thereby resist further stretching. This process is also called the stretch reflex.

- Beta motor neurons innervate intrafusal muscle fibers of muscle spindles, with collaterals to extrafusal fibres. There are two types of beta motor neurons: Slow Contracting- These innervate extrafusal fibers. Fast Contracting- These innervate intrafusal fibers.
- Gamma motor neurons innervate intrafusal muscle fibers found within the muscle spindle. They regulate the sensitivity of the spindle to muscle stretching. With activation of gamma neurons, intrafusal muscle fibers contract so that only a small stretch is required to activate spindle sensory neurons and the stretch reflex. There are two types of gamma motor neurons: Dynamic- These focus on Bag1 fibers and enhance dynamic sensitivity. Static- These focus on Bag2 fibers and enhance stretch sensitivity.
- Regulatory factors of lower motor neurons
  - Size Principle – this relates to the soma of the motor neuron. This restricts larger neurons to receive a larger excitatory signal in order to stimulate the muscle fibers it innervates. By reducing unnecessary muscle fiber recruitment, the body is able to optimize energy consumption.
  - Persistent Inward Current (PIC) – recent animal study research has shown that constant flow of ions such as calcium and sodium through channels in the soma and dendrites influence the synaptic input. An alternate way to think of this is that the post-synaptic neuron is being primed before receiving an impulse.
  - After Hyper-polarization (AHP) – A trend has been identified that shows slow motor neurons to have more intense AHPs for a longer duration. One way to remember this is that slow muscle fibers can contract for longer, so it makes sense that their corresponding motor neurons fire at a slower rate.

==== Special visceral motor neurons ====
These are also known as branchial motor neurons, which are involved in facial expression, mastication, phonation, and swallowing. Associated cranial nerves are the oculomotor, abducens, trochlear, and hypoglossal nerves.

Branch of NS	Position	Neurotransmitter
Somatic	n/a	Acetylcholine
Parasympathetic	Preganglionic	Acetylcholine
Parasympathetic	Ganglionic	Acetylcholine
Sympathetic	Preganglionic	Acetylcholine
Sympathetic	Ganglionic	Norepinephrine*
*Except fibers to sweat glands and certain blood vessels Motor neuron neurotransmitters

==== General visceral motor neurons ====
These motor neurons indirectly innervate cardiac muscle and smooth muscles of the viscera (the muscles of the arteries): they synapse onto neurons located in ganglia of the autonomic nervous system (sympathetic and parasympathetic), located in the peripheral nervous system (PNS), which themselves directly innervate visceral muscles (and also some gland cells).

In consequence, the motor command of skeletal and branchial muscles is monosynaptic involving only one motor neuron, either somatic or branchial, which synapses onto the muscle. Comparatively, the command of visceral muscles is disynaptic involving two neurons: the general visceral motor neuron, located in the CNS, synapses onto a ganglionic neuron, located in the PNS, which synapses onto the muscle.

All vertebrate motor neurons are cholinergic, that is, they release the neurotransmitter acetylcholine. Parasympathetic ganglionic neurons are also cholinergic, whereas most sympathetic ganglionic neurons are noradrenergic, that is, they release the neurotransmitter noradrenaline. (see Table)

=== Neuromuscular junctions ===
A single motor neuron may innervate many muscle fibres and a muscle fibre can undergo many action potentials in the time taken for a single muscle twitch. As a result, if an action potential arrives before a twitch has completed, the twitches can superimpose on one another, either through summation or a tetanic contraction. In summation, the muscle is stimulated repetitively such that additional action potentials coming from the somatic nervous system arrive before the end of the twitch. The twitches thus superimpose on one another, leading to a force greater than that of a single twitch. A tetanic contraction is caused by constant, very high frequency stimulation—the action potentials come at such a rapid rate that individual twitches are indistinguishable, and tension rises smoothly eventually reaching a plateau.

The interface between a motor neuron and muscle fiber is a specialized synapse called the neuromuscular junction. Upon adequate stimulation, the motor neuron releases a flood of acetylcholine (Ach) neurotransmitters from synaptic vesicles bound to the plasma membrane of the axon terminals. The acetylcholine molecules bind to postsynaptic receptors found within the motor end plate. Once two acetylcholine receptors have been bound, an ion channel is opened and sodium ions are allowed to flow into the cell. The influx of sodium into the cell causes depolarization and triggers a muscle action potential. T tubules of the sarcolemma are then stimulated to elicit calcium ion release from the sarcoplasmic reticulum. It is this chemical release that causes the target muscle fiber to contract.

In invertebrates, depending on the neurotransmitter released and the type of receptor it binds, the response in the muscle fiber could be either excitatory or inhibitory. For vertebrates, however, the response of a muscle fiber to a neurotransmitter can only be excitatory, in other words, contractile. Muscle relaxation and inhibition of muscle contraction in vertebrates is obtained only by inhibition of the motor neuron itself. This is how muscle relaxants work by acting on the motor neurons that innervate muscles (by decreasing their electrophysiological activity) or on cholinergic neuromuscular junctions, rather than on the muscles themselves.

=== Synaptic input to motor neurons ===
Motor neurons receive synaptic input from premotor neurons. Premotor neurons can be 1) spinal interneurons that have cell bodies in the spinal cord, 2) sensory neurons that convey information from the periphery and synapse directly onto motoneurons, 3) descending neurons that convey information from the brain and brainstem. The synapses can be excitatory, inhibitory, electrical, or neuromodulatory. For any given motor neuron, determining the relative contribution of different input sources is difficult, but advances in connectomics have made it possible for fruit fly motor neurons. In the fly, motor neurons controlling the legs and wings are found in the ventral nerve cord, homologous to the spinal cord. Fly motor neurons vary by over 100X in the total number of input synapses. However, each motor neuron gets similar fractions of its synapses from each premotor source: ~70% from neurons within the VNC, ~10% from descending neurons, ~3% from sensory neurons, and ~6% from VNC neurons that also send a process up to the brain. The remaining 10% of synapses come from neuronal fragments that are unidentified by current image segmentation algorithms and require additional manual segmentation to measure.

== See also ==
- Betz cell
- Central chromatolysis
- Motor dysfunction
- Motor neuron disease
- Nerve
- Sensory nerve
- Motor nerve
- Afferent nerve fiber
- Efferent nerve fiber
- Sensory neuron

== Sources ==
- Sherwood, L. (2001). Human Physiology: From Cells to Systems (4th ed.). Pacific Grove, CA: Brooks-Cole. ISBN 0-534-37254-6.
- Marieb, E. N.; Mallatt, J. (1997). Human Anatomy (2nd ed.). Menlo Park, CA: Benjamin/Cummings. ISBN 0-8053-4068-8.
