= Grey columns =

Three columns of grey matter within the spinal cord

- Cross section of the spinal cord. The three grey columns make up the butterfly-shaped shaded region

Details

Identifiers
- Latin: columnae griseae
- TA98: A14.1.02.101
- TA2: 6063
- FMA: 77867

The grey columns are three regions of the somewhat ridge-shaped mass of grey matter in the spinal cord. These regions present as three columns: the anterior grey column, the posterior grey column, and the lateral grey column, all of which are visible in cross-section of the spinal cord.

The anterior grey column is made up of alpha motor neurons, gamma motor neurons, and small neurons thought to be interneurons. It affects the skeletal muscles.

The posterior grey column receives several types of sensory information regarding touch and sensation from receptors in the skin, bones, and joints, including fine touch, proprioception, and vibration. It contains the cell bodies of second-order sensory neurons and their synapses with the pseudounipolar first-order sensory neurons (whose cell bodies are located within the sensory ganglia (a.k.a. dorsal root ganglia)).

The lateral grey column is only present in the thoracic region and upper lumbar segments (T1-L2). It contains preganglionic cell bodies of the autonomic nervous system and sensory relay neurons.

== Structure ==
=== Anterior grey column ===
The location of motor neurons in the anterior grey column of the spinal cord

The anterior grey column, (also known as the anterior horn of spinal cord and anterior cornu) is broad and of a rounded or quadrangular shape. Its posterior part is termed the base, and its anterior part the head, but these are not differentiated from each other by any well-defined constriction. It is separated from the surface of the spinal cord by a layer of white substance which is traversed by the bundles of the anterior nerve roots. In the thoracic region, the posterolateral part of the anterior column projects laterally as a triangular field, which is named the lateral grey column. It comprises three different types of neurons, two types of lower motor neuron – large alpha motor neurons, and medium gamma motor neurons, and small neurons thought to be interneurons. These neurons differ in both their morphology and in their patterns of connectivity. They are organized in the same manner as the muscles they innervate.

==== Alpha motor neurons ====
Alpha motor neurons are lower motor neurons that innervate extrafusal muscle fibers to generate force at neuromuscular junctions at the start of a muscle contraction. They have large cell bodies and receive proprioceptive input. They have been shown to reduce in population, but not in size with age. Damage to these cell bodies can lead to severe muscle weakness and loss of reflexes, and is also associated with ALS.

==== Gamma motor neurons ====
Gamma motor neurons innervate intrafusal muscle fibers that control the sensitivity of muscle spindles to stretch. They have smaller cell bodies than alpha motor neurons and do not receive proprioceptive input. They have been shown to reduce in numbers but not size with age.

==== Small neurons ====
The physiology of the small neurons in the anterior column is not well understood. Their effects can be both excitatory and inhibitory. They are suspected to be interneurons and have been shown to reduce in size but not numbers with age.

Clinical significance

It is these cells that are affected in the following diseases, – amyotrophic lateral sclerosis, spinal and bulbar muscular atrophy, Charcot–Marie–Tooth disease, progressive muscular atrophy, all spinal muscular atrophies, poliomyelitis, and West Nile virus.

Pharmacological interaction

The anterior grey column is the target for some spasmolytic medications. Norepinephrine release here, (as induced by cyclobenzaprine) reduces spasms by innervation (reducing nerve activity) of alpha motor neurons via interaction with gamma fibers.

=== Posterior grey column ===
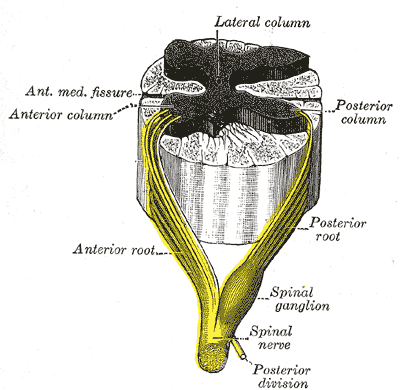
Spinal nerve forming from grey column

The posterior grey column, also known as the posterior (or dorsal) horn of spinal cord, is subdivided into six layers known as Rexed laminae, based on the type of sensory information sent to each section.

- Marginal nucleus of spinal cord (lamina I)
- Substantia gelatinosa of Rolando (lamina II)
- Nucleus proprius (laminae III, IV)
- Spinal lamina V, the neck of the posterior horn
- Spinal lamina VI, the base of the posterior horn.

The other four laminae are located in the other two grey columns in the spinal cord.

The function of the spinal dorsal horn is to process and integrate sensory information from the peripheral nervous system. It receives inputs from primary afferent fibers and modulatory systems, and it projects to higher brain centers and motor neurons. The dorsal horn circuitry is involved in various aspects of sensory processing, including discrimination, integration, and modulation of nociceptive and non-nociceptive signals. Dysfunction of the dorsal horn circuitry has been implicated in chronic pain conditions and other neurological disorders.

Laminae I and II receive information from afferent neurons that sense nociception, temperature, and itching, laminae III and IV are sent information from neurons that sense mechanical pressure, and laminae V and VI are sent information from proprioceptors. It is known to be the primary relay point for haptic and nociceptive messages. The posterior horn is also known as a partially layered structure because only laminae I and II are well defined.

The column can also be separated by nociceptive and non-nociceptive senses. Laminae I and II are important in nociception, laminae III and IV are not involved nociception, and lamina V is involved in both nociception and non-nociception.

The function of the spinal dorsal horn is to process and integrate sensory information from the peripheral nervous system. It receives inputs from primary afferent fibers and modulatory systems, and it projects to higher brain centers and motor neurons. The dorsal horn circuitry is involved in various aspects of sensory processing, including discrimination, integration, and modulation of nociceptive and non-nociceptive signals. Dysfunction of the dorsal horn circuitry has been implicated in chronic pain conditions and other neurological disorders.

Laminae

==== Lamina I ====
Lamina I is also known as the marginal nucleus of spinal cord. The majority of posterior column projection neurons are located in lamina I, however most neurons in this layer are interneurons. The main areas these neurons innervate are the caudal ventrolateral medulla (CVLM), the nucleus of the solitary tract (NTS), the lateral parabrachial area (LPb), the periaqueductal grey matter (PAG), and certain regions in the thalamus. The CVLM receives nociceptive and cardiovascular responses. The NTS receives cardio-respiratory inputs and affects reflex tachycardia from noxious stimulation. The LPb projects to the amygdala and hypothalamus and is involved in the emotional response to pain. The PAG develops ways to deal with pain and is a main target of analgesics. It projects to other parts of the brainstem. The nuclei of the thalamus affect sensory and motivational aspects of pain. The neurons of this lamina can be distinguished by their morphology as pyramidal, spindle, or multipolar.

==== Lamina II ====
This layer is also known as the substantia gelatinosa of Rolando and has the highest density of neurons. These neurons mediate the activity of nociceptive and temperature afferent fibers. It is almost entirely made up of interneurons which can be further divided by their morphology. The four main morphological classes, based on the shape of their dendritic structure, are islet, central, vertical, and radial cells. The interneurons can also be divided by their function: excitatory or inhibitory. The excitatory interneurons release glutamate as their main neurotransmitter and the inhibitory interneurons use GABA and/or glycine as their main neurotransmitter. The neurons of this layer are only C fibers and contain almost no myelin.

==== Laminae III and IV ====
These laminae are also known as the nucleus proprius and contain a much smaller density of neurons than lamina II. There are projection neurons scattered throughout these layers. Mechanosensitive A beta fibers terminate in these layers. The layers receive input from lamina II and also control pain, temperature, and crude touch. C fibers that control nociception and temperature and sensory information from mechanoreceptors are relayed here.

==== Lamina V ====
This lamina is also known as the neck of the posterior column and receives information from mechanoreceptors and danger information from nociceptors. It has different neurons in different regions. In the medial region it contains medium-sized triangular neurons and the lateral region contains medium-sized multipolar neurons.

==== Lamina VI ====
This lamina is only found in the cervical and lumbar regions of the spinal cord. It receives afferent input from muscle fibers and joints.

=== Lateral grey column ===
The lateral grey column, or the lateral horn of spinal cord, is part of the sympathetic nervous system and receives input from brain stem, organs, and hypothalamus. The lateral column is only present in the thoracic region and upper lumbar segments. The lateral grey column contains preganglionic cell bodies of the autonomic nervous system and sensory relay neurons.

== Clinical significance ==
Neurons in the anterior column have been shown to be affected by amyotrophic lateral sclerosis (ALS). The number of large alpha motor neurons and medium gamma motor neurons was greatly reduced and the number of small neurons was either slightly or greatly reduced depending on the type of ALS.

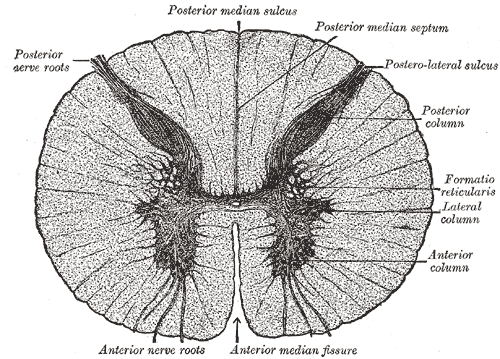
Cross-sectional view of spinal cord

Muscular atrophy has also been shown to have an effect on neurons of the anterior column. A large loss of large alpha motor neurons, medium gamma motor neurons, and small neurons was recorded in cases of muscular atrophy.

Damage to the lateral column can result in Horner's syndrome.

Multiple system atrophy (MSA), has also been linked to the lateral grey column. MSA has been shown to reduce the cell count in the lateral column by over 50%.

The posterior column has a prominent role in the pain system, it is the first central relay in the nociceptive pathway. The first-order afferent neuron carries sensory information to the second order neuron in the dorsal horn. The axon of the second order neuron, if it is a projection neuron and not an interneuron, then goes to the third order neuron in the thalamus. The thalamus is known as the "gateway to the cortex". The third order neuron then goes to the cerebral cortex. The afferent neurons are either A fibers or C fibers. A fibers are myelinated allowing for faster signal conduction. Among these there are A beta fibers which are faster and carry information about non-painful touch and A delta fibers which are slower and thinner than the A beta fibers. The C fibers are not myelinated and therefore slower. C fibers that carry nociceptive signals can be divided into two types: fibers that contain neuropeptides, like substance P, and fibers that do not contain neuropeptides. The two types terminate in very different areas. Non-peptidergic C fibers are linked to the skin, where they innervate the epidermis while peptidergic C fibers innervate other tissues and deeper parts of the skin.

There are two main types of nociceptive signals: sensory and affective.

=== Sensory ===
Sensory nociceptive signals provide information about what kind of stimulus (heat, mechanical, etc.) is affecting the body and also indicates where on the body the stimulus is. Sensory nociceptive neurons have a small receptive field to help pinpoint the exact location of a stimulus.

=== Affective ===
Affective nociceptive signals affect emotions. These signals go to the limbic system and tell the body to react to the danger stimulus (i.e. removing a hand from a hot stove). These neurons have larger receptive fields because the emotional reaction to most pain stimuli is similar.

== See also ==
- Beta motor neuron
- Gamma motor neuron
- Posterior column-medial lemniscus pathway
- Posterior horn of lateral ventricles
- Type Ia sensory fiber
