= Gamma motor neuron =

Lower motor neuron involved in muscle contraction

- A muscle spindle, with γ motor and Ia sensory fibers

Identifiers
- MeSH: D009047
- NeuroLex ID: sao1438006234
- FMA: 83660

A gamma motor neuron (γ motor neuron), also called gamma motoneuron, or fusimotor neuron, is a type of lower motor neuron that takes part in the process of muscle contraction, and represents about 30% of (Aγ) fibers going to the muscle. Like alpha motor neurons, their cell bodies are located in the anterior grey column of the spinal cord. They receive input from the reticular formation of the pons in the brainstem. Their axons are smaller than those of the alpha motor neurons, with a diameter of only 5 μm. Unlike the alpha motor neurons, gamma motor neurons do not directly adjust the lengthening or shortening of muscles. However, their role is important in keeping muscle spindles taut, thereby allowing the continued firing of alpha neurons, leading to muscle contraction. These neurons also play a role in adjusting the sensitivity of muscle spindles.

The presence of myelination in gamma motor neurons allows a conduction velocity of 4 to 24 meters per second, significantly faster than with non-myelinated axons but slower than in alpha motor neurons.

== General background of muscles ==
=== Muscle spindles ===
Muscle spindles are the sensory receptors located within muscles that allow communication to the spinal cord and brain with information of where the body is in space (proprioception) and how fast body limbs are moving with relation to space (velocity). They are mechanoreceptors in that they respond to stretch and are able to signal changes in muscle length. The sensitivity of detecting changes in muscle length are adjusted by fusimotor neurons – gamma and beta motor neurons. Muscle spindles can be made up of three different types of muscle fibers: dynamic nuclear bag fibers (bag_{1} fibers), static nuclear bag fibers (bag_{2} fibers), and nuclear chain fibers.

=== Types of lower motor neurons ===
Muscle spindles are innervated by both sensory neurons and motor neurons in order to provide proprioception and make the appropriate movements via firing of motor neurons. There are three types of lower motor neurons involved in muscle contraction: alpha motor neurons, gamma motor neurons, and beta motor neurons. Alpha motor neurons, the most abundant type, are used in the actual force for muscle contraction and therefore innervate extrafusal muscle fibers (muscle fibers outside of the muscle spindle). Gamma motor neurons, on the other hand, innervate only intrafusal muscle fibers (within the muscle spindle), whereas beta motor neurons, which are present in very low amounts, innervate both intrafusal and extrafusal muscle cells. Beta motor neurons have a conduction velocity greater than that of both other types of lower motor neurons, but there is little currently known about beta motor neurons. Alpha motor neurons are highly abundant and larger in size than gamma motor neurons.

== Alpha gamma co-activation ==
When the central nervous system sends out signals to alpha neurons to fire, signals are also sent to gamma motor neurons to do the same. This process maintains the tautness of muscle spindles and is called alpha gamma co-activation. The nuclei of spindle muscle cells are located in the middle of these spindles, but unlike extrafusal muscle fibers, the myofibril contractile apparatus of spindle fibers are located only at both ends of spindle. Efferent stimulation of the spindle by gamma motor neurons contracts the myofibrils, tautening the central region of spindle—which maintains the muscle spindle's sensitivity to muscle's length change.

Without gamma motor neurons, muscle spindles would be very loose as the muscle contracts more. This does not allow for muscle spindles to detect a precise amount of stretch since it is so limp. However, with alpha gamma co-activation and both alpha and gamma neurons firing, muscle fibers within the muscle spindles are pulled parallel to the extrafusal contraction causing the muscle movement. The firing of gamma motor neurons in sync with alpha motor neurons pulls muscle spindles from polar ends of the fibers as this is where gamma motor neurons innervate the muscle. The spindle is innervated by type Ia sensory fiber that go on to synapse with alpha motor neurons, completing the gamma-loop. The parallel pulling keeps muscle spindles taut and readily able to detect minute changes in stretch.

== Fusimotor system ==
The central nervous system controls muscle spindle sensitivity via the fusimotor system that consists of muscle spindles along with gamma motor neurons also called fusimotor neurons. Beta motor neurons innervate extrafusal as well as intrafusal muscle fibers, and are more specifically named skeletofusimotor neurons. Gamma motor neurons are the efferent (sending signals away from the central nervous system) part of the fusimotor system, whereas muscle spindles are the afferent part, as they send signals relaying information from muscles toward the spinal cord and brain.

== Gamma bias ==
Gamma bias is gamma motor neurons' consistent level of activity. Smaller neurons require a smaller amount of excitatory input to reach its threshold compared to larger neurons. Therefore, gamma motor neurons (smaller in size than alpha motor neurons) are more likely to fire than the larger alpha motor neurons. This creates a situation with relatively few alpha motor neurons firing but some gamma motor neurons constantly firing in conditions where muscle stretch or force is not occurring. The sensitivity of sensory endings (primary and secondary endings - Ia, II) of the muscle spindle are based on the level of gamma bias (i.e. how much background level of gamma motor neuron discharge is taking place.)

== Types ==
=== Static ===
Static gamma motor neurons innervate static nuclear bag fibers (bag2 fibers), a type of nuclear bag fiber and nuclear chain fibers. Both of these fiber types are part of the intrafusal muscle spindle fibers, where the static gamma motor neurons innervate onto. Nuclear chain fibers' nuclei are organized in longitudinal columns, which is where it gets its name from, whereas the nuclear bag fibers' nuclei are clumped in the midsection of the muscle spindle. There is approximately a 2:1 ratio of nuclear chain fibers to nuclear bag fibers. The static gamma motor neurons increase their firing, in response to an increase in magnitude of change in length and controls the static sensitivity of the stretch reflex. For this reason, this type of gamma motor neuron is mostly used in the maintenance of postures and slower movements such as lifting a box, rather than activities requiring rapid changes due to rapid change in muscle length.

=== Dynamic ===
Dynamic gamma motor neurons innervate the dynamic nuclear bag fibers (bag1 fibers), another type of nuclear bag fiber smaller than the static nuclear bag fibers. This type of gamma motor neuron can enhance the sensitivities of Ia sensory neurons. It is done so because the dynamic nuclear bag fibers, which are innervated by the dynamic gamma motor neurons, receive Ia sensory innervation. Furthermore, the firing of dynamic gamma motor neurons removes the slack in dynamic nuclear bags, bringing Ia fibers closer to the firing threshold. Dynamic gamma motor neurons alter muscle spindle sensitivity and increases its discharge in response to velocity, the rate of change, of muscle length rather than simply the magnitude as it is with static gamma motor neurons. Therefore, this type of gamma motor neuron can be used for activities requiring quick changes in muscle length to adjust such as balancing on a rail.

=== Effects of nuclear chain fibers ===
The effect of nuclear chain fibers on primary endings is to drive the discharge up to a frequency of around 60 Hz in a linear fashion, above which the discharge can become irregular. The activities of bag_{2} fibers show an initial sharp peak in discharge, which gets less as the receptor adapts. Bag_{2} fibers also reduce the dynamic sensitivity of the Ia afferent and sometimes also reduce the length sensitivity. Activation of bag_{1} fibers has the effect of increasing both the length sensitivity and the dynamic sensitivity of the primary ending.

It is believed that the secondary sensory endings serve to measure length and muscle contractions of nuclear chain fibers at the pole via the static γ-motoneurons both excite the ending and increase its length sensitivity. Bag_{1} and bag_{2} fibers receive very little innervation from secondary endings, and activation of these fibers has a minimal effect on the discharge of the secondary ending.

Characteristics	Static Gamma Motor Neurons	Dynamic Gamma Motor Neurons
Innervates	static nuclear bag fibers (bag2 fibers) and nuclear chain fibers	dynamic nuclear bag fibers (bag1 fibers)
Responds to	changes in magnitude of muscle length	changes in velocity of muscle length
Aids in	sensitivity of stretch reflex	muscle spindle sensitivity
Mainly used for	static sustained muscle movement	quick movements requiring rapid change

== Development ==
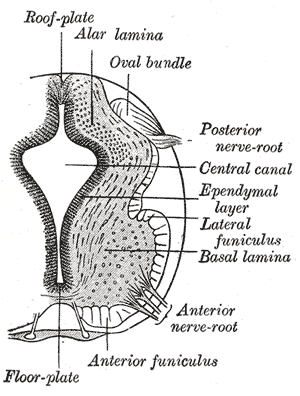
Gamma Motor Neurons are derived from the basal plate of the embryo

Gamma motor neurons develop similarly to alpha motor neurons at the beginning. They originate in the basal plate, which is the ventral portion of the neural tube in the developing embryo. Sonic hedgehog genes (Shh) are an important part of the development process that is secreted by the notochord creating gradients of concentrations. After the hedgehog genes, various other molecular markers and transcription factors play a role in differentiating motor neurons into the specific gamma motor neurons.

Gamma motor neurons, like all cells, express specific genetic markers at birth. Muscle spindle derived GDNF neurotrophic factors must also be present for postnatal survival. Wnt7A is a secreted signaling molecule selectively in gamma motor neurons by embryonic day 17.5 of mice. This is the earliest molecule present in gamma motor neurons that differentiates them from alpha motor neurons, illustrating the divergence of these two types of lower motor neurons.

In addition, serotonin receptor 1d (5-ht 1d) has been concluded to be a novel marker for gamma motor neurons enabling researchers to distinguish between the various types of lower motor neurons. Mice lacking this serotonin receptor 1d, displayed lower monosynaptic reflex (a reflex arc involving only a sensory and motor neuron), which may be caused by a reduced response to sensory stimulation in motor neurons. In addition, knockout mice without this serotonin receptor exhibited more coordination on a balance beam task, suggesting that less activation of motor neurons by Ia afferents during movement could reduce the unnecessary excess of muscle output.

Another distinguishing molecular marker of gamma motor neurons is transcription factor Err3. It is expressed at high levels in gamma motor neurons, but very little in alpha motor neurons. On the other hand, neuronal DNA binding protein NeuN, are present in significantly greater quantities in alpha motor neurons. Osteopontin, a protein also expressed in bones, hence the "osteo-" prefix, is a marker for alpha motor neurons. This in turn can provide scientists a way of eliminating gamma motor neurons if alpha motor neurons are of interest. One study in particular made this conclusion based on the fact that osteopontin was present in larger cell bodies, indicating the alpha motor neurons as they have larger cell bodies than gamma motor neurons.

== Muscle tone ==
Although muscles can be in a relaxed state, muscles have a general resting level of tension. This is termed muscle tone and is maintained by the motor neurons innervating the muscle. Its purpose is to maintain posture and assist in quicker movements, since if muscles were completely loose, then more neuronal firing would need to take place.

The amount of tension in the muscles depends primarily on the resting level discharge of alpha motor neurons and Ia spindle afferents. Gamma motor neurons are also involved through their action on intrafusal muscle fibers. The intrafusal muscle fibers control the resting level of the Ia afferent pathway, which in turn creates a steady level of alpha neuron activity.

Muscle tone can also be due to tonic discharge of gamma motor neurons. The activation to these neurons are mostly from the descending fibers of the facilitatory reticular formation. This leads to the stretching of muscle spindle, activation of alpha motor neurons and finally a partially contracted muscle. The cerebellum is the alpha-gamma motor neuron linkage. Therefore, with the cerebellum the muscle tension is maintained via alpha motor neurons as well as the gamma motor neurons.

== Abnormal activity ==
Hypotonia can be due to damage to alpha neurons or Ia afferents carrying sensory information to the alpha neurons. This creates a decrease in muscle tone. Opposite to this, hypertonia is caused by damage to descending pathways that terminate in the spinal cord. It increases muscle tone by increasing the total responsiveness of alpha motor neurons from its Ia sensory input.

Spasms can be caused by a disparity between how much alpha and gamma motor neurons are firing, i.e. too much gain of one or the other. The imbalance causes an inaccurate reading from muscle receptors in the muscle spindle. Therefore, the sensory neurons feeding back to the brain and spinal cord are misleading. For example, if a patient has over active gamma motor neurons, there will be a resistance to passive movement causing stiffness, also called spasticity. This is often found in individuals with damage to higher centers affecting the descending pathways. This can sometimes cause a gamma-bias (constant discharge of some gamma motor neurons) to be greater or less than usual. In the case for patients with excess gamma bias, the sensory endings within muscle spindles are discharging too frequently causing there to be more muscle activity than appropriate. Furthermore, this hyperactivity in the gamma spindle loop can cause spasticity.

Gamma motor neurons assist in keeping the muscle spindle taut, thus adjusting sensitivity. Therefore, if proper gamma motor neuronal firing does not occur, muscle movement can be adversely affected. Fine motor skills such as movements with the fingers and eyes are affected most, since any lack of tautness within the muscle spindle hinders its ability to detect the amount of stretch through the sensory endings. This means that the muscle will not be able to precisely move accordingly. Lesions controlling descending pathways in lower motor neurons to the upper limbs, can cause a loss in patient's ability to have fine movement control.

In clinical settings, it is possible to test whether someone has an abnormally low or high gamma gain simply by moving the patient's arm. Gamma gain is the process where acceleration, velocity, and length of muscle changes are scaled up equally, enabling more accurate movements to take place in the appropriate situation. If it is more difficult to bend a patient's arm at the elbow back and forth, then he/she has higher gamma gain while someone whose arm moves very easily will have lower gamma gain.

Oscilloscopes can be used to measure action potentials of an axon from a motor neuron in order to assess general muscle activity. Though it cannot distinguish alpha motor neurons from gamma motor neurons, it is useful in understanding whether one has abnormal motor neuron activity. With low rates of activity of the descending pathway, fewer and smaller motor neurons are activated, leading to a small amount of muscle force. This will appear on the oscilloscope as lower peaks on the y-axis.
