= Type Ia sensory fiber =

Type of afferent nerve fiber

A muscle spindle, with γ motor and Ia sensory fibers

A type Ia sensory fiber (also group Ia afferent fiber, or primary afferent fiber) is one of two types of afferent (sensory) nerve fibers innervating muscle spindles - a type of stretch receptor encountered in nearly all striated muscles. Type Ia sensory fibers are fast-conducting, large-diameter, thickly myelinated muscle fibers conveying rapidly adaptating (dynamic) proprioceptive information regarding velocity (rate of change) of muscle stretch from the nuclear bag fibers. The other type of afferent fibres innervating muscle spindles are the slower-conducting type II sensory fibers which convey slowly adaptating (static) information regarding sustained state of muscle stretch.

Type Ia fibers innervate both the nuclear bag fibers and the nuclear chain fibers. Type Ia fibers coil around the non-contractive central region of each intrafusal muscle fiber of a muscle spindle to form so-called annulospinal primary endings or primary sensory endings (type II sensory fibers meanwhile innervate the periphery of the sensory middle portion of nuclear chain intrafusal fibers on one or both sides of the central area innervated by type Ia fibers). Type Ia fibers convey phasic responses to small changes in stretch. Dynamic gamma motor neurons adjust the tautness of the central intrafusal region to maintain the dynamic responsiveness of type Ia fibers.

Type Ia fibers participate in mediating the stretch reflex by exciting motor neurons innervating synergist muscles and inhibiting motor neurons innervating antagonist muscles via interneurons. The stretch reflex thus operates as a negative feedback loop maintaining a given muscle length (and thus body position).

== See also ==
- Intrafusal muscle fiber
- Type II sensory fiber
- Gamma motor neuron
- Beta motor neuron
- Proprioception
- Motor system
- Muscle
- Muscle spindle
- Reflex action
- Posterior grey column
