= Beta motor neuron =

Lower motor neuron involved in muscle contraction

Beta motor neurons (β motor neurons), also called beta motoneurons, are a few kind of lower motor neuron, along with alpha motor neurons and gamma motor neurons. Beta motor neurons innervate intrafusal fibers of muscle spindles with collaterals to extrafusal fibers - a type of slow twitch fiber. Also, axons of alpha, beta, and gamma motor neurons become myelinated. Moreover, these efferent neurons originate from the anterior grey column of the spinal cord and travel to skeletal muscles. However, the larger diameter alpha motor fibers require higher conduction velocity than beta and gamma.

== Types ==
There are two kinds of beta motor neuron (as gamma motor neuron) that include:

- Static beta motor neurons. These motor neurons innervate nuclear chain fibers of muscle spindles, with collaterals to extrafusal muscle fibers.
- Dynamic beta motor neurons. The dynamic type innervates nuclear bag fibers of muscle spindles, with collaterals to extrafusal muscle fibers.

Gamma motor neurons innervate only intrafusal fibers of muscle spindles, but extrafusal fibers (i.e. slow and fast fibers) are innervated by alpha motoneurons.

== See also ==
- Nerve fiber
- Type Ia sensory fiber
- Type II sensory fiber
