= Nuclear bag fiber =

Intrafusal muscle fiber

Details

Identifiers
- Latin: myofibra sacculiformis
- TH: H3.03.00.0.00013

A nuclear bag fiber is one of two types of intrafusal muscle fibers in muscle spindles (the other being the nuclear chain fibers), so named because its muscle cell nuclei are congregated into a bulged section ("bag") at the middle portion of the fiber. It is innervated solely by type Ia sensory fibers (whereas nuclear chains fibers are innervated by both type Ia and type II sensory fibers) and responds to dynamic changes in muscle stretch.

The diameter of nuclear bag fibers is about twice that of nuclear chain fibers. Each muscle spindle contains 1–3 nuclear bag fibers.

The tautness of nuclear chain fibers is adjusted mainly by dynamic γ motor neurons to optimise the dynamic response of the muscle spindle.

== Types ==
There are two kinds of bag fibers based upon contraction speed and motor innervation:

1. BAG2 fibers are the largest. They have no striations in middle region and swell to enclose nuclei.
2. BAG1 fibers, smaller than BAG2.

Both bag types extend beyond the spindle capsule.

== See also ==
- Nuclear chain fiber
- List of distinct cell types in the adult human body
