= Nuclear chain fiber =

Specialized sensory organ within a muscle

- A muscle spindle, with γ motor and Ia sensory fibers

Details
- Part of: Muscle spindle

Identifiers
- Latin: myofibra catenaformis
- TH: H3.03.00.0.00014

A nuclear chain fiber is one of two types of intrafusal muscle fibers in muscle spindles (the other being the nuclear bag fibers), so named because its muscle cell nuclei are arranged in a "chain" along the whole length of the sensory middle portion of the fiber. It is innervated by both type Ia and type II sensory fibers (whereas nuclear bag fibers are innervated solely by type Ia sensory fibers) and responds tonically according to the degree of static muscle stretch.

Nuclear chain fibers are about half the diameter of nuclear bag fibers. Each muscle spindle contains 3–9 nuclear bag fibers.

The tautness of nuclear chain fibers is adjusted mainly by static γ motor neurons to optimise the static response of the muscle spindle.

== See also ==
- Intrafusal muscle fiber
- Muscle spindle
- Stretch receptor
- Type Ia sensory fiber
- Type II sensory fiber
- γ motor neuron
- List of distinct cell types in the adult human body
