= Stretch receptor =

Sensory receptor type

Stretch receptors are mechanoreceptors responsive to distention of various organs and muscles, and are neurologically linked to the medulla in the brain stem via afferent nerve fibers. Examples include stretch receptors in the arm and leg muscles and tendons, in the heart, in the colon wall, and in the lungs.

Stretch receptors in the bladder cause the urge to urinate when the bladder is full.

Stretch receptors are also found around the carotid artery, where they monitor blood pressure and stimulate the release of antidiuretic hormone (ADH) from the posterior pituitary gland.

Types include:

- Golgi organ
- Muscle spindle, sensory receptors within the belly of a muscle, which primarily detect changes in the length of this muscle
- Pulmonary stretch receptors, mechanoreceptors found in the lungs
- Chordotonal organ, in insects and crustaceans

== See also ==
- Stretch sensor
- Carotid sinus
- Aortic arch
- Mechanoreceptor
