= Afferent nerve fiber =

Axonal projections that arrive at a particular brain region

- Afferent nerve fibers transmit information from the peripheral to the central nervous system.

Details
- System: Nervous system

Identifiers
- Latin: neurofibrae afferentes
- TA98: A14.2.00.017
- TH: H2.00.06.1.00015
- FMA: 76570

Afferent nerve fibers are axons (nerve fibers) of sensory neurons that carry sensory information from sensory receptors to the central nervous system. Many afferent projections arrive at a particular brain region.

In the peripheral nervous system, afferent nerve fibers are part of the sensory nervous system and arise from outside of the central nervous system. Sensory and mixed nerves contain afferent fibers.

== Structure ==
Nervous system organization - the motor and sensory systems

Afferent neurons are pseudounipolar neurons that have a single process leaving the cell body dividing into two branches: the long one towards the sensory organ, and the short one toward the central nervous system (e.g. spinal cord). These cells do have sensory afferent dendrites, similar to those typically inherent in neurons. They have a smooth and rounded cell body located in the ganglia of the peripheral nervous system. Just outside the spinal cord, thousands of afferent neuronal cell bodies are aggregated in a swelling in the dorsal root known as the dorsal root ganglion.

All of the axons in the dorsal root, which contains afferent nerve fibers, are used in the transduction of somatosensory information. Somatosensory receptors include senses such as pain, touch, temperature, itch, and stretch. For example, a specific muscle fiber called an intrafusal muscle fiber is a type of afferent neuron that lies parallel to the extrafusal muscle fibers thus functions as a stretch receptor by detecting muscle length.

All of these sensations travel along the same general pathways towards the brain. One pathway—dorsal column–medial lemniscus pathway—begins with sensation from the periphery being sent via afferent nerve fiber of the dorsal root ganglion (first order neuron) through the spinal cord to the dorsal column nuclei (second order neuron) in the brainstem. The second order neuron's projection decussates at the medulla through medial lemniscus to the third order neurons in the thalamus. The third order neuron's axon terminates at the primary somatosensory cortex of the parietal lobe.

=== Types ===
Types of afferent fibers include the general somatic, the general visceral, the special somatic and the special visceral afferent fibers.

Alternatively, in the sensory system, afferent fibers can be classified by sizes with category specifications depending on if they innervate the skins or muscles.

Sensory fiber types
Myelination	Diameter (μm)	Speed (m/s)	From muscles	From skin	Receptors
Thick	12-20	72-120	I	Aα	Proprioceptors (muscle spindle, Golgi tendon organ)
Medium	6-12	35-75	II	Aβ	Merkel nerve ending, tactile corpuscle, lamellar corpuscle, Bulbous corpuscle
Thin	1-6	4-36	III	Aδ	Free nerve ending
None	0.2-1.5	0.4-2.0	IV	C	Free nerve ending

== Function ==
In the nervous system, there is a "closed loop" system of sensation, decision, and reactions. This process is carried out through the activity of sensory neurons, interneurons, and motor neurons. A touch or painful stimulus, for example, creates a sensation in the brain only after information about the stimulus travels there via afferent nerve pathways.

== Etymology and mnemonics ==
Afferent is derived from Latin participle afferentem (af- = ad- : to + ferre : bear, carry), meaning carrying into, whereas efferent is derived from ex ferens, meaning carrying away (e- = ex- means 'from'). Ad and ex give an mnemonic device for remembering the relationship between afferent and efferent : afferent connection arrives and an efferent connection exits.

Another mnemonic device used for remembering afferent and efferent (in terms of the spinal cord, with its dorsal/ventral organization) is SAME DAVE. Sensory Afferent Motor Efferent, Dorsal Afferent Ventral Efferent.

Afferent and efferent are connected to affect and effect through their common Latin roots: afferent nerves affect the subject, whereas efferent nerves allow the subject to effect change.

== See also ==
- Autonomic nervous system
- Sensory nerve
- Motor nerve
- Efferent nerve fiber
- Sensory neuron
- Motor neuron

== Other References ==
- Gardner, Esther P; Johnson, Kenneth O (2013). "22 - The Somatosensory System: Receptors and Central Pathway". In Kandel, Eric R; Schwartz, James H; Jessell, Thomas M; Siegelbaum, Steven A; Hudspeth, AJ (eds.). Principles of Neural Science (5th ed.). United States: McGraw-Hill. ISBN 978-0-07-139011-8.
