= Type II sensory fiber =

Type of afferent nerve fiber

Type II sensory fibers or group II sensory fibers are afferent (sensory) nerve fibers tonically conveying information from slowly-adaptating receptors.

== Stretch receptors ==
Group Aα type II sensory fiber tonically convey proprioceptive information regarding static muscle stretch/length from nuclear chain intrafusal fibers of muscle spindles which function as stretch receptors. One or two type II fibers innervate the periphery of the sensory central region of each nuclear chain intrafusal fiber to one or both sides (respectively) of the middle portion that is instead innervated by a type Ia sensory fiber. Type II fibers typically branch out upon the nuclear chain fiber, but may sometimes instead coil around it like the type Ia fibers; type II fibers are said to form secondary afferent endings, whereas type Ia fibers form primary endings.

== Touch receptors ==
Group Aβ type II sensory fibers are afferent (sensory) nerve fibers conveying information from slowly-adaptating touch receptions, notably Merkel cell-neurite complexes (sense static touch), and Ruffini endings (sense skin stretch and over-extension inside joints).
