= Alpha motor neuron =

Large lower motor neurons of the brainstem and spinal cord

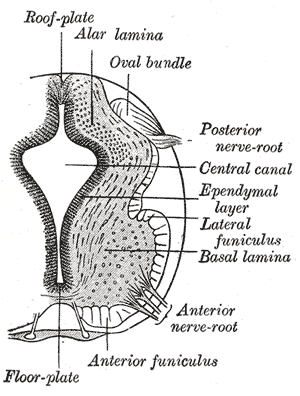
- Alpha motor neurons are derived from the basal plate (basal lamina) of the developing embryo.

Identifiers
- NeuroLex ID: sao1154704263
- TH: H2.00.01.0.00008
- FMA: 83664

Alpha (α) motor neurons (also called alpha motoneurons), are large, multipolar lower motor neurons of the brainstem and spinal cord. They innervate extrafusal muscle fibers of skeletal muscle and are directly responsible for initiating their contraction. Alpha motor neurons are distinct from gamma motor neurons, which innervate intrafusal muscle fibers of muscle spindles.

While their cell bodies are found in the central nervous system (CNS), α motor neurons are also considered part of the somatic nervous system—a branch of the peripheral nervous system (PNS)—because their axons extend into the periphery to innervate skeletal muscles.

An alpha motor neuron and the muscle fibers it innervates comprise a motor unit. A motor neuron pool contains the cell bodies of all the alpha motor neurons involved in contracting a single muscle.

== Location ==
Alpha motor neurons (α-MNs) innervating the head and neck are found in the brainstem; the remaining α-MNs innervate the rest of the body and are found in the spinal cord. There are more α-MNs in the spinal cord than in the brainstem, as the number of α-MNs is directly proportional to the amount of fine motor control in that muscle. For example, the muscles of a single finger have more α-MNs per fibre, and more α-MNs in total, than the muscles of the quadriceps, which allows for finer control of the force a finger applies.

In general, α-MNs on one side of the brainstem or spinal cord innervate muscles on that same side of the body. An exception is the trochlear nucleus in the brainstem, which innervates the superior oblique muscle of the eye on the opposite side of the face.

=== Brainstem ===
In the brainstem, α-MNs and other neurons reside within clusters of cells called nuclei, some of which contain the cell bodies of neurons belonging to the cranial nerves. Not all cranial nerve nuclei contain α-MNs; those that do are motor nuclei, while others are sensory nuclei. Motor nuclei are found throughout the brainstem—medulla, pons, and midbrain—and for developmental reasons are found near the midline of the brainstem.

Generally, motor nuclei found higher in the brainstem (i.e., more rostral) innervate muscles that are higher on the face. For example, the oculomotor nucleus contains α-MNs that innervate muscles of the eye, and is found in the midbrain, the most rostral brainstem component. By contrast, the hypoglossal nucleus, which contains α-MNs that innervate the tongue, is found in the medulla, the most caudal (i.e., towards the bottom) of the brainstem structures.

=== Spinal cord ===
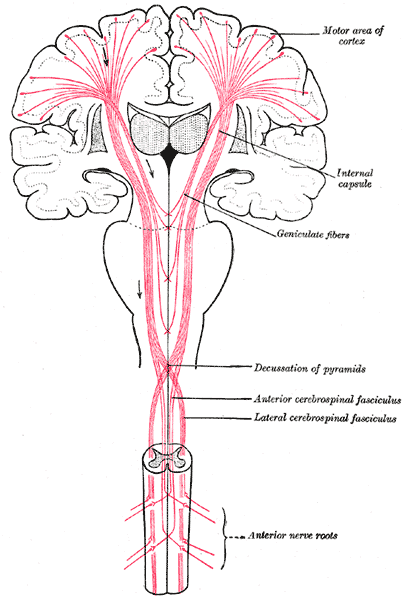
The corticospinal tract is one of the major descending pathways from the brain to the α-MNs of the spinal cord.

In the spinal cord, α-MNs are located within the gray matter that forms the ventral horn. These α-MNs provide the motor component of the spinal nerves that innervate muscles of the body.

Alpha motor neurons are located in lamina IX according to the Rexed lamina system.

As in the brainstem, higher segments of the spinal cord contain α-MNs that innervate muscles higher on the body. For example, the biceps brachii muscle, a muscle of the arm, is innervated by α-MNs in spinal cord segments C5, C6, and C7, which are found rostrally in the spinal cord. On the other hand, the gastrocnemius muscle, one of the muscles of the leg, is innervated by α-MNs within segments S1 and S2, which are found caudally in the spinal cord.

Alpha motor neurons are located in a specific region of the spinal cord's gray matter. This region is designated lamina IX in the Rexed lamina system, which classifies regions of gray matter based on their cytoarchitecture. Lamina IX is located predominantly in the medial aspect of the ventral horn, although there is some contribution to lamina IX from a collection of motor neurons located more laterally. Like other regions of the spinal cord, cells in this lamina are somatotopically organized, meaning that the position of neurons within the spinal cord is associated with what muscles they innervate. In particular, α-MNs in the medial zone of lamina IX tend to innervate proximal muscles of the body, while those in the lateral zone tend to innervate more distal muscles. There is similar somatotopy associated with α-MNs that innervate flexor and extensor muscles: α-MNs that innervate flexors tend to be located in the dorsal portion of lamina IX; those that innervate extensors tend to be located more ventrally.

== Development ==
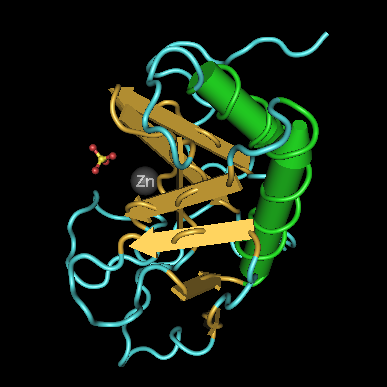
Under the influence of the protein sonic hedgehog, shown here, cells of the floor plate of the developing spinal cord differentiate into alpha motor neurons.

Alpha motor neurons originate in the basal plate, the ventral portion of the neural tube in the developing embryo. Sonic hedgehog (Shh) is secreted by the nearby notochord and other ventral structures (e.g., the floor plate), establishing a gradient of highly concentrated Shh in the basal plate and less concentrated Shh in the alar plate. Under the influence of Shh and other factors, some neurons of the basal plate differentiate into α-MNs.

Like other neurons, α-MNs send axonal projections to reach their target extrafusal muscle fibers via axon guidance, a process regulated in part by neurotrophic factors released by target muscle fibers. Neurotrophic factors also ensure that each muscle fiber is innervated by the appropriate number of α-MNs. As with most types of neurons in the nervous system, α-MNs are more numerous in early development than in adulthood. Muscle fibers secrete a limited amount of neurotrophic factors capable of sustaining only a fraction of the α-MNs that initially project to the muscle fiber. Those α-MNs that do not receive sufficient neurotrophic factors will undergo apoptosis, a form of programmed cell death.

Because they innervate many muscles, some clusters of α-MNs receive high concentrations of neurotrophic factors and survive this stage of neuronal pruning. This is true of the α-MNs innervating the upper and lower limbs: these α-MNs form large cell columns that contribute to the cervical and lumbar enlargements of the spinal cord. In addition to receiving neurotrophic factors from muscles, α-MNs also secrete a number of trophic factors to support the muscle fibers they innervate. Reduced levels of trophic factors contributes to the muscle atrophy that follows an α-MN lesion.

== Connectivity ==
Like other neurons, lower motor neurons have both afferent (incoming) and efferent (outgoing) connections. Alpha motor neurons receive input from a number of sources, including upper motor neurons, sensory neurons, and interneurons. The primary output of α-MNs is to extrafusal muscle fibers. This afferent and efferent connectivity is required to achieve coordinated muscle activity.

=== Afferent input ===
Selected pathways between upper motor neurons and alpha motor neurons
UMN origin	α-MN target	Tract name
Cerebral cortex	Brainstem	Corticonuclear tract
Cerebral cortex	Spinal cord	Corticospinal tract
Red nucleus	Spinal cord	Rubrospinal tract
Vestibular nuclei	Spinal cord	Vestibulospinal tract
Midbrain tectum	Spinal cord	Tectospinal tract
Reticular formation	Spinal cord	Reticulospinal tract

Upper motor neurons (UMNs) send input to α-MNs via several pathways, including (but not limited to) the corticonuclear, corticospinal, and rubrospinal tracts. The corticonuclear and corticospinal tracts are commonly encountered in studies of upper and lower motor neuron connectivity in the control of voluntary movements.

The corticonuclear tract is so named because it connects the cerebral cortex to cranial nerve nuclei. (The corticonuclear tract is also called the corticobulbar tract, as the target in the brainstem—which is medulla—is archaically called the "bulb.") It is via this pathway that upper motor neurons descend from the cortex and synapse on α-MNs of the brainstem. Similarly, UMNs of the cerebral cortex are in direct control of α-MNs of the spinal cord via the lateral and ventral corticospinal tracts.

The sensory input to α-MNs is extensive and has its origin in Golgi tendon organs, muscle spindles, mechanoreceptors, thermoreceptors, and other sensory neurons in the periphery. These connections provide the structure for the neural circuits that underlie reflexes. There are several types of reflex circuits, the simplest of which consists of a single synapse between a sensory neuron and a α-MNs. The knee-jerk reflex is an example of such a monosynaptic reflex.

The most extensive input to α-MNs is from local interneurons, which are the most numerous type of neuron in the spinal cord. Among their many roles, interneurons synapse on α-MNs to create more complex reflex circuitry. One type of interneuron is the Renshaw cell.

=== Efferent output ===
Alpha motor neurons send fibers that mainly synapse on extrafusal muscle fibers. Other fibers from α-MNs synapse on Renshaw cells, i.e. inhibitory interneurons that synapse on the α-MN and limit its activity in order to prevent muscle damage.

== Signaling ==
Like other neurons, α-MNs transmit signals as action potentials, rapid changes in electrical activity that propagate from the cell body to the end of the axon. To increase the speed at which action potentials travel, α-MN axons have large diameters and are heavily myelinated by both oligodendrocytes and Schwann cells. Oligodendrocytes myelinate the part of the α-MN axon that lies in the central nervous system (CNS), while Schwann cells myelinate the part that lies in the peripheral nervous system (PNS). The transition between the CNS and PNS occurs at the level of the pia mater, the innermost and most delicate layer of meningeal tissue surrounding components of the CNS.

The axon of an α-MN connects with its extrafusal muscle fiber via a neuromuscular junction, a specialized type of chemical synapse that differs both in structure and function from the chemical synapses that connect neurons to each other. Both types of synapses rely on neurotransmitters to transduce the electrical signal into a chemical signal and back. One way they differ is that synapses between neurons typically use glutamate or GABA as their neurotransmitters, while the neuromuscular junction uses acetylcholine exclusively. Acetylcholine is sensed by nicotinic acetylcholine receptors on extrafusal muscle fibers, causing their contraction.

Like other motor neurons, α-MNs are named after the properties of their axons. Alpha motor neurons have Aα axons, which are large-caliber, heavily myelinated fibers that conduct action potentials rapidly. By contrast, gamma motor neurons have Aγ axons, which are slender, lightly myelinated fibers that conduct less rapidly.

== Clinical significance ==
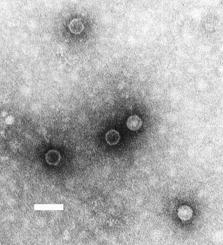
Poliomyelitis, caused by the poliovirus seen here, is associated with the selective loss of cells within the ventral horn of the spinal cord, where α-MNs are located.

Injury to α-MNs is the most common type of lower motor neuron lesion. Damage may be caused by trauma, ischemia, and infection, among others. In addition, certain diseases are associated with the selective loss of α-MNs. For example, poliomyelitis is caused by a virus that specifically targets and kills motor neurons in the ventral horn of the spinal cord. Amyotropic lateral sclerosis likewise is associated with the selective loss of motor neurons.

Paralysis is one of the most pronounced effects of damage to α-MNs. Because α-MNs provide the only innervation to extrafusal muscle fibers, losing α-MNs effectively severs the connection between the brainstem and spinal cord and the muscles they innervate. Without this connection, voluntary and involuntary (reflex) muscle control is impossible. Voluntary muscle control is lost because α-MNs relay voluntary signals from upper motor neurons to muscle fibers. Loss of involuntary control results from interruption of reflex circuits such as the tonic stretch reflex. A consequence of reflex interruption is that muscle tone is reduced, resulting in flaccid paresis. Another consequence is the depression of deep tendon reflexes, causing hyporeflexia.

Muscle weakness and atrophy are inevitable consequences of α-MN lesions as well. Because muscle size and strength are related to the extent of their use, denervated muscles are prone to atrophy. A secondary cause of muscle atrophy is that denervated muscles are no longer supplied with trophic factors from the α-MNs that innervate them. Alpha motor neuron lesions also result in abnormal EMG potentials (e.g., fibrillation potentials) and fasciculations, the latter being spontaneous, involuntary muscle contractions.

Diseases that impair signaling between α-MNs and extrafusal muscle fibers, namely diseases of the neuromuscular junction have similar signs to those that occur with α-MN disease. For example, myasthenia gravis is an autoimmune disease that prevents signaling across the neuromuscular junction, which results in functional denervation of muscle.

== See also ==
- Beta motor neuron
- Anterior grey column
