= Extrafusal muscle fiber =

Skeletal standard muscle fibers

Details
- Part of: Skeletal muscle

Identifiers
- Latin: myofibra extrafusalis
- TH: H3.03.00.0.00007

Extrafusal muscle fibers are the standard skeletal muscle fibers that are innervated by alpha motor neurons and generate tension by contracting, thereby allowing for skeletal movement. They make up the large mass of skeletal striated muscle tissue and are attached to bone by fibrous tissue extensions (tendons).

Each alpha motor neuron and the extrafusal muscle fibers innervated by it make up a motor unit. The connection between the alpha motor neuron and the extrafusal muscle fiber is a neuromuscular junction, where the neuron's signal, the action potential, is transduced to the muscle fiber by the neurotransmitter acetylcholine.

Extrafusal muscle fibers are not to be confused with intrafusal muscle fibers, which are innervated by sensory nerve endings in central noncontractile parts and by gamma motor neurons in contractile ends and thus serve as a sensory proprioceptor.

Extrafusal muscle fibers can be generated in vitro (in a dish) from pluripotent stem cells through directed differentiation. This allows study of their formation and physiology.

== See also ==
- Intrafusal muscle fiber
- Type Ia sensory fiber
- Type II sensory fiber
- Alpha motor neuron
- Gamma motor neuron
- Beta motor neuron
