= Intrafusal muscle fiber =

Skeletal muscle fibers

- A muscle spindle, with γ motor and Ia sensory fibers

Details
- Part of: Skeletal muscle
- Function: Proprioception

Identifiers
- Latin: myofibra intrafusalis
- TH: H3.03.00.0.00012

Intrafusal muscle fibers are skeletal muscle fibers that serve as specialized sensory organs (proprioceptors). They detect the amount and rate of change in length of a muscle. They constitute the muscle spindle, and are innervated by both sensory (afferent) and motor (efferent) fibers.

Intrafusal muscle fibers are not to be confused with extrafusal muscle fibers, which contract, generating skeletal movement and are innervated by alpha motor neurons.

== Structure ==
=== Types ===
There are two types of intrafusal muscle fibers: nuclear bag fibers and nuclear chain fibers. They bear two types of sensory ending, known as annulospiral and flower-spray endings. Both ends of these fibers contract, but the central region only stretches and does not contract.

Intrafusal muscle fibers are walled off from the rest of the muscle by an outer connective tissue sheath consisting of flattened fibroblasts and collagen. This sheath has a spindle or "fusiform" shape, hence the name "intrafusal".

=== Innervation ===
They are innervated by gamma motor neurons and beta motor neurons. Gamma efferents from small multipolar neurons from anterior gray column innervate it. These form a part of neuromuscular spindles.

== Function ==
Intrafusal muscle fibers detect the amount and rate of change in muscle length. It is by the sensory information from gamma motor neurons and beta motor neurons that an individual is able to judge the position of their muscles.

== See also ==
- Alpha motor neuron
- Beta motor neuron
- Extrafusal muscle fiber
- Gamma motor neuron
- Type Ia sensory fiber
- Type II sensory fiber
