= Tropic cues involved in growth cone guidance =

Fig.1: Various tropic cues interact to guide the growth cone; the initial role of these cues was identified as either repulsive (red) or attractive (green).

The growth cone is a highly dynamic structure of the developing neuron, changing directionality in response to different secreted and contact-dependent guidance cues; it navigates through the developing nervous system in search of its target. The migration of the growth cone is mediated through the interaction of numerous trophic and tropic factors; netrins, slits, ephrins and semaphorins are four well-studied tropic cues (Fig.1). The growth cone is capable of modifying its sensitivity to these guidance molecules as it migrates to its target; this sensitivity regulation is an important theme seen throughout development.

== Netrins ==
Fig.2: Netrin signaling has multiple roles in guidance.

Netrins are diffusible chemoattractive molecules that guide commissural axons across the midline; they are secreted by floor plate cells at ventral midline of the spinal cord. Netrins establish a gradient to direct commissural axons at a distance; Netrin-2 is expressed broadly in the ventral two thirds of the spinal cord, but not in the floor plate. Mice with netrin-1 loss-of-function exhibit severe disruption in commissural axon migration; this experiment established the importance of Netrin-1 in guidance decisions.

Netrin-1 gradient in Xenopus laevis ganglion cell can induce turning of retinal growth cones in vitro to steer axons out of the retina. Netrin (unc-6, Caenorhabditis elegans homologue) and its corresponding receptor DCC (Deleted in Colorectal Cancer) were initially identified as an attractive interaction. DCC, expressed by commissural axons, binds to netrin with high affinity; inhibiting netrin/DCC signaling interferes with the attractive turning of retinal growth cones.

Netrin-1 has also been shown to act as a chemorepellent in vivo for trochlear motor axons that migrate dorsally away from the floor plate. In netrin-1 deficient mice, trochlear axon projections are normal, suggesting the existence of other redundant guidance cues working in tandem with netrin-1 to repel trochlear axons.

Studies in C. elegans revealed a possible mechanism for netrin acting as a chemorepulsive agent (Fig.2). Unc-5, a transmembrane protein, is required for dorsal migration of axons in nematodes; it was determined that unc-5 acts as a repulsive receptor for Netrin (unc-6). The switch between attractive and repulsive netrin signaling can be mediated by misexpression of unc-5 in commissural axons. Netrin-1/DCC binding induces DCC homodimerization leading to an attractive response; on the other hand, the chemorepellent response is triggered via netrin-1 binding to unc-5/DCC heterodimers.

Netrin repulsion can also be mediated by changes in cyclic nucleotide levels; netrin-1 induces a repulsive response when cAMP signaling is inhibited. Cis interactions of netrin/DCC (attractive) and Slit/Robo (repulsive) in commissural axons silence both signaling cues; this illustrates how multiple tropic cues interact to guide the commissural axons to their targets.

== Slits ==
Fig.3: Drosophila and vertebrates use different mechanisms to regulate their sensitivity to Slit mediated repulsion at the midline. Drosophila regulate their sensitivity through Comm mediated endosomal trafficking of Robo (top panel); vertebrates use alternatively spliced Robo3 isoforms to regulate Slit signaling (bottom panel).

Repulsive cues play an important role in guiding growth cones to their appropriate target; roundabout (Robo) receptors and their ligand, Slit, are a well-studied example of repulsive guidance. Robo receptors were initially identified in Drosophila melanogaster using a forward genetic screen to search for molecules involved in midline crossing at the floor plate. Robo/Slit loss-of-function mutations result in axons crossing the midline multiple times, whereas gain-of-function results in little to no midline crossing; consequently this interaction was determined to be important in preventing non-commissural axons from crossing the midline and commissural axons from recrossing.

How the commissural axon regulates its response to Slit repulsion at the midline has been extensively studied in both Drosophila and vertebrates; in these two models the growth cone's response to Slit has been shown to be regulated through receptor trafficking and alternative splicing, respectively (Fig.3).

Receptor trafficking is used extensively throughout growth cone migration; in Drosophila prior to crossing the midline these neurons express commissureless (comm), a protein involved in Robo receptor trafficking. Comm prevents Robo from reaching the cell membrane by targeting the receptor for the endosomal pathway; this allows the growth cone of the commissural axon to cross the midline by preventing Robo/Slit repulsive interactions. Comm expression turns off after the growth cone has crossed the midline; this permits Robo/Slit repulsion and prevents the growth cone from crossing the midline again.

Vertebrates, on the other hand, do not possess a comm homolog; instead they facilitate midline crossing through alternative splicing of Robo3 (aka.Rig-1). Robo3 has two isoforms, 3.1 and 3.2, and these isoforms interact with Robo1 and Robo2 (Robo1/2) through cis interactions at the leading edge of the growth cone. Before crossing the midline Robo3.1 inhibits Slit/Robo repulsive signaling, allowing the commissural axon to cross; after crossing the midline Robo 3.1 is replaced by Robo3.2 to facilitate the repulsive Slit/Robo signaling through cis interactions with Robo1/2.

Slit/Robo signaling is seen throughout the developing nervous system and is demonstrative of the importance of repulsive cues in growth cone migration; the aforementioned regulation of these repulsive barriers determines the path of the commissural axon.

== Ephrins ==
Fig.4: Ephrin/Eph bidirectional signaling; forward signaling (ligand to receptor) and reverse signaling (receptor to ligand).

In the 1940s Roger Sperry was conducting experiments on newts and frogs to understand how axons are guided to their topographic locations; he did this by cutting the optic nerve and rotating the detached eye 180°. What he observed was that the animals behaved as if their visual world was back-to-front and upside-down when presented with a lure in front of them. He explained this behavior by the existence of two or more gradients "that spread across and through each other with their axes roughly perpendicular"; this became known as the chemoaffinity hypothesis. This subsequently lead to extensive research and the discovery of two repulsive factors, Ephrin-A5 and Ephrin-A2, by observing axon growth in retinal tissue culture on a striped carpet of anterior and posterior tectum membrane.

Ephrins are divided into 2 classes: Ephrin-As are bound to the membrane through GPI (glycosylphosphatidylinositol) linkage and Ephrin-Bs have a transmembrane domain and a short cytoplasmic domain; they interact with their respective receptors Eph-A and Eph-B which are members of the tyrosine kinase family. One unusual feature about Ephrins is their ability to bidirectionally signal (Fig.4); they can participate in both forward (ligand to receptor) and reverse signaling (receptor to ligand). Eph/Ephrin binding induces conformational changes in the Ephrin transmembrane and cytoplasmic domains, activating the signaling pathway. Eph/Ephrin forward signaling regulates actin dynamics via small GTPases of the Rho family; reverse signaling occurs when the Ephrin-B cytoplasmic tail gets phosphorylated at tyrosine residues. Ephrin-B also contains a PDZ binding motif important in axon guidance regulation via G-protein signaling. Reverse signaling can also occur when Ephrin-A is activated by Eph-A3 binding; this is regulated by metalloprotease-dependent cleavage of Ephrin-A.

Eph/Ephrin bidirectional signaling is important for axon guidance and target selection; mapping of retinal axons along anterior-posterior axis in the visual system is regulated by Ephrin-A/Eph-A mediated repulsion. In the tectum, the transcription factor Engrailed creates an Ephrin-A concentration gradient along the anterior-posterior axis; this results in different signaling cues to the growth cones which also express graded levels of the receptor. The topographic location of retinal axons along dorsal-ventral axis requires both forward and reverse signaling by Ephrin-B/Eph-B gradient mediated attraction.

As described above for the visual system, Eph/Ephrin signaling plays an important role in topographic mapping in several other regions of the developing nervous system; the bidirectional signaling illustrates some of the complex regulatory mechanisms involved in growth cone guidance and target selection.

== Semaphorins ==
Fig.5: Semaphorins can exist either in a soluble form or membrane bound form. Both are utilized in axonal repulsion, but recent studies demonstrate that Semaphorins can also mediate attraction. In addition, soluble Sema3A binds to Neuropilin-1, which lacks an intracellular domain and thus co-signals with Plexin A. Sema4A in its membrane form binds to Plexin B1 for its signaling pathway. Together, these mammalian Semaphorins can mediate axonal guidance and target selection.

Semaphorins are a family of chemical signaling molecules involved in axonal targeting and guidance. Sema3 was the first vertebral Semaphorin discovered, and since then Semaphorins have been shown to elicit both attraction and repulsive responses in commissural axons; additionally, Semaphorins can function as a secreted or contact-dependent guidance cue (Fig.5).

Semaphorins have also been shown to mediate other neuronal processes besides targeting such as: apoptosis, cell migration, axon pruning, synaptic transmission, and axonal transport. Semaphorins are the main ligands for the Neuropilin 1 (Npn1) receptor; this receptor is typically located in the medial and lateral portions of the lateral motor column during the early embryonic period of motor neuron development. Upon binding Semaphorins, the Npn1 receptor transmits signaling to adjacent surface molecules, known as Plexins; this is necessary because the Npn1 receptor lacks an intracellular domain. The intracellular signaling mediated through Semaphorins results in growth cone collapse, guidance, and turning; this intracellular signaling is transduced through Rho family GTPases, which act to remodel the cytoskeleton of the cell. In addition, several other cell surface molecules have been shown to interact with secreted Semaphorins. One example is the Ig cell-adhesion molecule (IgCAM) family; this family of adhesion molecules are suggested to interact with Semaphorins to fine tune their axonal projections and targeting. The multitude of molecules that complex with Semaphorins may be the result of the ubiquitous nature of Semaphorin expression in vertebrates.

During embryonic neurodevelopment, synapse elimination and axonal pruning are critical to ensure normal functioning of the central and peripheral nervous system. Studies have suggested that Sema3A/Neuropilin 2 (Npn2) interactions mediate synapse elimination and axonal pruning, as demonstrated by Sema3A/Npn2 loss-of-function studies in mice. The attractive cues mediated by Semaphorins are not well understood at the moment; however, protein kinase focal adhesion kinase (FAK) and MAP Kinase (MAPK) have been implicated in mediating downstream attractive signaling upon Semaphorin receptor stimulation.

Semaphorins also play a critical role in cranial nerve development; studies using mice deficient in Sema3A and Sema3F have resulted in abnormal cranial nerve extension and defasciculation, while Sema3F has been suggested to be required in order to establish projections of cranial nerves. Mice deficient in membrane bound Sema6A showed misprojection of corticothalamic fibers and axon projections from the hippocampus to olfactory bulb. Knocking out certain members of Semaphorins, such as Sema5A, resulted in embryonic lethality in mice and thus it has been difficult to elucidate the role of Sema5A in neurodevelopment. While the previous example suggested that Semaphorins may play pivotal roles in maintaining viable neurons, for the most part Semaphorin knockout animals display mild phenotypes.

Scientists thus hypothesize that there is considerable redundancy of Semaphorin family types. Future studies may focus on the implication of Semaphorins in neurologic diseases, and thus developing synthetic versions of Semaphorin receptor agonists/antagonists could be beneficial for both embryonic and adult neurologic dysfunction.
