= Congenital mirror movement disorder =

- This condition is inherited via autosomal dominant manner

Congenital mirror movement disorder (CMM disorder) is a rare genetic neurological disorder which is characterized by mirrored movement, sometimes referred to as associated or synkinetic movement, most often in the upper extremity of the body. These movements are voluntary intentional movements on one, ipsilateral, side of the body that are mirrored simultaneously by involuntary movements on the contralateral side.

The reproduction of involuntary movement usually happens along the head-tail axis, having a left-right symmetry. For example, if someone were to voluntarily make a fist with their left hand, their right hand would do the same. In most cases, the accompanying contralateral involuntary movements are much weaker than the ipsilateral voluntary ones, although the extent and magnitude of the mirrored movement vary across patients. This disorder has not yet been found to be associated with any other neurologic disease or cognitive disability, and currently, no cures nor means to improve signs or symptoms have been found.

The congenital mirror movements begin in infancy and persist throughout the patient's life, often with very little improvement, or deterioration. Consequently, patients with this movement disorder have serious difficulty carrying out tasks that require manual dexterity or precision, such as playing a two handed musical instrument or typing on a keyboard, for their whole lives. Patients also often experience discomfort or pain in the upper limbs due to prolonged use of the same muscles. Therefore, quality of life can be severely hampered.

CMM disorder's prevalence in the world is thought to be less than 1 in 1 million people. Because of its rarity, researchers suggest that some mildly affected individuals may never be diagnosed. It is important not to confuse congenital mirror movement disorders, a rare genetically based neurologic disease, with acquired mirror movement disorders that present themselves during one's lifetime due to other reasons (stroke for example).

== Presentation ==
=== Related Diseases ===
- Movement disorders
- Chiari malformation
- Klippel-Feil Syndrome
- Dystonia
- Cerebral palsy
- Parkinson's disease
- Epilepsies
- Amyotrophic lateral sclerosis
- Kallman's syndrome
- Alien hand syndrome
- Obsessive compulsive disorder
- Schizophrenia
- Congenital hemiplegia
- Moebius syndrome
- Seckel syndrome
- Wildervanck syndrome
- Polymicrogyria

== Causes ==
The specific molecular mechanism that underpins this movement disorder is not well known. However, most researchers suggest that it follows an autosomal dominant genetic inheritance pattern in which mutations in certain genes give rise to structural abnormalities in nervous system networks responsible for voluntary skeletal muscle movement, which, in turn, result in the functional movement abnormalities seen in patients. Despite being autosomal dominant, the disease has variable expressivity. That is, patients who have inherited a mutated dominant allele, along with their genetically affected parent, can be symptomatic or asymptomatic for CMM disorder. The genes that currently have evidence to be associated with CMM disorder include DCC (deleted in colorectal carcinoma), DNAL4 (dynein axonemal light chain 4), and RAD51 (recombination protein A).

DCC encodes a receptor for NTN1 (netrin-1), a protein thought to be responsible for axon guidance and neuronal cell migration during development. A mutation of this gene (including nonsense, splice site mutation, insertions, frameshift) has been identified as a possible cause for CMM disorder. Experiments in mice also support the claim that CMM disorder is associated with genetic mutations in DCC. Kanga mice, lacking the P3 intracellular domain of the DCC receptor, show a hopping gait, moving their hind legs in a strictly paired fashion, as do kangaroos.

DNAL4 encodes a component of dynein motor complex in commissural neurons of the corpus callosum. In contrast to DCC, DNAL4 is thought to have a recessive inheritance pattern for the CMM disorder. In CMM disorder patients, researchers found splice site mutations on DNAL4, which caused skipping of exon 3, and thereby omission of 28 amino acids from DNAL4 protein. This mutant DNAL4 protein, in turn, could lead to faulty cross-hemisphere wiring, resulting in CMM.

RAD51 maintains genome integrity by repairing DNA double-strand breaks through homologous recombination. RAD51 heterozygous mutations, specifically premature termination codons, have been found in many CMM disorder patients through genome-wide linkage analysis and exome sequencing. In a mouse model, researchers also found RAD51 products in corticospinal tract axons at the pyramidal decussation. They therefore suggest that RAD51 might be a gene that, when haploinsufficient, causes CMM disorder in humans. RAD51 in neurons has been shown to play a role in the regulation of Netrin signalling and axon misguidance phenotypes. This function is not clearly linked to the known DNA repair function of RAD51.

Despite identification of three prospective genes, no genotype–phenotype correlations have yet been found. That is, the severity of clinical signs and symptoms does not correlate with the type of genetic variant. Mutations in the above genes account for a total of about 35 percent of cases. Mutations in other genes that have not been identified likely account for the other cases of this disorder.

== Pathophysiology ==
There are three main pathophysiological hypotheses for congenital mirror movement disorder that exist.

=== Interhemispheric connections ===
First, some researchers believe that this neurological disorder is due to abnormal communication between cerebral hemispheres. They explain the mechanism of the physiological miscommunication with on development.

Amongst many neuronal changes in the brain during normal human brain development, researchers claim that the corpus callosum shows a gradual increase number of myelinated axons. This suggests that up until a certain age, the corpus callosum is heavily unmyelinated. This would explain why children during normal development can be seen with CMM disorder up to the age of 7 years, likely due to lack of corpus callosum development. The normal disappearance of clinically significant mirror movements after this age is associated with anatomical and functional maturation of interhemispheric connections through the corpus callosum between motor cortices. Researchers hypothesize that this axonal density in the corpus callosum is responsible for the interhemispheric communication that is ultimately responsible for the suppression of mirror movements during voluntary movements in healthy adults. Therefore, disruptions in corpus callosum circuits could lead to CMM.

=== Motor cortex ===
Another pathophysiological explanation that researchers suggest for CMM disorder is that there is a miscommunication during motor movement execution. This claim is supported by evidence of structural abnormalities in the primary motor cortex (M1) in CMM patients. These structural abnormalities in the motor cortex might explain why the hands, requiring great motor dexterity and therefore have a large cortical representation, are often the target of and have more severe mirror movement in CMM disorder.

=== Corticospinal tract ===
A third pathophysiological explanation proposed by researchers has to do with the corticospinal tract (CST). Healthy newborns in fact have ipsilateral CST projections up until the age of around 7. During normal adult development, these axonal projects disappear. This might provide an alternate explanation for the presence of mild mirror movements in normally developing young children that typically disappear before the age of 7.

Some researchers propose that DCC mutations cause a reduction in gene expression and less robust midline guidance, which may lead to a partial failure of axonal fiber crossing and encourage development of an abnormal ipsilateral connection. This is confirmed by other researchers who demonstrate that patients with DDC mutants show an increased proportion of ipsilateral axonal projections, and show that even a very small number of aberrant ipsilateral descending axons is sufficient to induce incorrect movement patterns.

These findings are corroborated by evidence from mice models, Kanga mice with a deletion of DCC, whose CST has been shown not to be altered, but rather partially rerouted ipsilaterally.

== Diagnosis ==
Currently, clinical diagnosis of CMM disorder has been based on clinical findings or molecular genetic testing.

Clinical Findings (Signs and Symptoms):

- onset of mirror movements in infancy or early childhood
- persistence of mirror movements into and throughout adulthood with the absence of other neurologic disorders
- little improvement nor deterioration of mirror movements over the course of one's life
- intensity of mirrored movements increasing with the complexity of the voluntary movement
- involuntary mirror movements that are generally of lesser amplitude compared with voluntary movements
- predominant mirror movement in upper limbs, with increasing severity in more distal appendages (fingers)
- inability to perform tasks requiring skilled bimanual coordination
- occasional pain in the upper limbs during prolonged manual activities
- occasional observed subclinical mirroring movement, but detectable with accelerometer gloves

Molecular genetic testing:

- identification of a heterozygous mutant DCC, DNAL4, or RAD51 gene (single gene test or multi-gene panel)

== Treatment ==
CMM has clear severe impacts on a patient's ability to carry out daily manual tasks. It is recommended that children be placed under more forgiving school environments, allowing more time for written evaluations and limiting handwritten assignments, to ease the burden of the movement disability. Furthermore, because of patients' inability to perform pure unilateral movements and their difficulty with tasks requiring skilled bimanual coordination, young and new members to the workforce are encouraged to consider professions that do not require complex bimanual movements, repetitive or sustained hand movements, or extensive handwriting, to reduce overuse, pain, and discomfort in upper limbs.

Because of its pronounced and obviously noticeable signs and symptoms, CMM patients can suffer social stigma; however, physicians need to make it clear to parents, family, and friends that the disorder bears no relation to intellectual abilities. However, the rarity of this neurologic disease, found in one in a million people, makes its societal and cultural significance quite limited.
