= Floor plate =

Floor plate may refer to:

- Floor plate (architecture): The assembled floor within a building
- Floor plate (biology): Part of the nervous system of vertebrate organisms
- Floor plate (construction): Temporary flooring to support heavy work and machines during construction
- Floor plate (firearms): The plate closing the bottom of the magazine recess of a bolt-action rifle
- Floor plate (framing): A horizontal, structural, load-bearing member supporting Wall plates
