= UNC-5 =

Protein family

Netrin/DCC receptor

Identifiers
- Symbol: Netrin/DCC receptor
- Membranome: 1137

UNC-5 is a receptor for netrins including UNC-6. Netrins are a class of proteins involved in axon guidance. UNC-5 uses repulsion to direct axons while the other netrin receptor UNC-40 attracts axons to the source of netrin production.

== Discovery of netrins ==
The term netrin was first used in a study done in 1990 in Caenorhabditis elegans and was called UNC-6. Studies performed on rodents in 1994 have determined that netrins are vital to guidance cues. The vertebrate orthologue of UNC-6, netrin-1 was determined to be a key guidance cue for axons moving toward the ventral midline in the rodent embryo spinal cord. Netrin-1 has been identified as a critical component of embryonic development with functions in axon guidance, cell migration, morphogenesis and angiogenesis. The most recent studies have found that there are 5 types of netrins expressed in animals. Ectotopic expression of UNC-5 can result in short or long range repulsion.

== Axon guidance ==
The guidance of axons to their targets in the developing nervous system is believed to involve diffusible chemotropic factors secreted by target cells. Floor plate cells at the ventral midline of the spinal cord secrete a diffusible factor or factors that promotes the outgrowth of spinal commissural axons and attracts these axons in vitro. Recent studies indicate that several axon guidance mechanisms are highly conserved in all animals, whereas others, though still conserved in a general sense, show strong evolutionary divergence at a detailed mechanistic level. Expression of UNC-6 netrin and its receptor UNC-5 is required for guiding pioneering axons and migrating cells in C. elegans. Netrins are axon guidance molecules that transmit their activity through 2 different receptors. The function of UNC-5 is to repel axons while the other receptor UNC-40 (or Deleted in Colorectal Cancer) attracts axons to the source of UNC-6 production. Methods such as antibody staining, transgene expression and microarray analysis have confirmed that UNC-5 is expressed in DA9 motor neurons. Eight pairs of chemosensory neurons in Caenorhabditis elegans take up fluorescein dyes entering through the chemosensory organs. When filled with dye, the processes and cell bodies of these neurons can be examined in live animals by fluorescence microscopy. Using this technique five genes were identified: unc-33, unc-44, unc-51, unc-76, and unc-106. These genes we found to affect the growth of the amphid and phasmid axons in mutants.

== Cell migration ==
There are three phases in hermaphrodite distal tip cell migration in Caenorhabditis elegans which are distinguished by the orientation of their movements which alternate between anteroposterior and dorsoventral axes. Experimentation has shown that UNC-5 is coincident with the second migration phase and that premature expression will result in turning in a UNC-6 dependent manner. This also demonstrates the mechanism that regulates UNC-5 is critical for UNC-6 netrin guidance cue responsiveness. Although it normally guides axons along the dorsoventral axis, UNC-40 can be co-opted with SAX-3 to affect cell migrations along the anterior posterior axis. VAB-8 protein is identified as an upstream regulator for UNC-40 and identifies the mechanism for polarity in axon and cell migration.

=== Formation ===
==== Growth ====
An experiment was performed to determine if UNC-5 is required for localization of presynaptic components in DA9. When testing the effect of unc-5::intron::unc-5 transgene on a mislocalization defect in UNC-5 mutant animals at 25 °C a significant rescue of the mislocalization defect was observed. In mutant animals, ventral and dorsal migrations are disrupted but longitudinal movements are unaffected. They discovered that this rescue does not occur at 16 °C because the transgene fails to produce UNC-5 at that temperature. This is relevant because is shows that the mislocalization defect is due to a change in temperature at the L4 larval stage which occurs after DA9 is fully developed. This suggests that UNC-5 is only required for the early outgrowth phase to guide axons. UNC-5 presents a novel function in maintaining polarized localization of GFP::RAB-3 independently of early polarization and guidance. When testing directly for whether UNC-6 netrin provides information for localization of presynaptic components an interesting discovery was made. The egl-20::unc-6 transgene creates an enlarged asynaptic zone of the DA9 dorsal axon. They further observed that the enlarged asynaptic domain is restored partly in UNC-5 which demonstrates that UNC-5 acts cell autonomously in DA9 in order to mediate ectopic UNC-6 exclusion of presynaptic components. The UNC-6 gradient is high ventrally and low dorsally and encompasses the dendrite and ventral axon of DA9. UNC-6 was recently found to cause the initial polarization of the C. elegans hermaphrodite specific neuronal cell body. The findings of this experiment suggest that UNC-6 and UNC-5 coordinate two different functions in DA9 and that the netrin is expressed after axon guidance is complete. Extracellular cues such as Wnt fibroblast growth factor can promote synapse formation, contradicting the traditional view of synapse formation from contact between synaptic partners to trigger the assembly of synaptic components. Inhibitory factors such as UNC-5 play essential roles in the formation and maintenance of synaptic components.

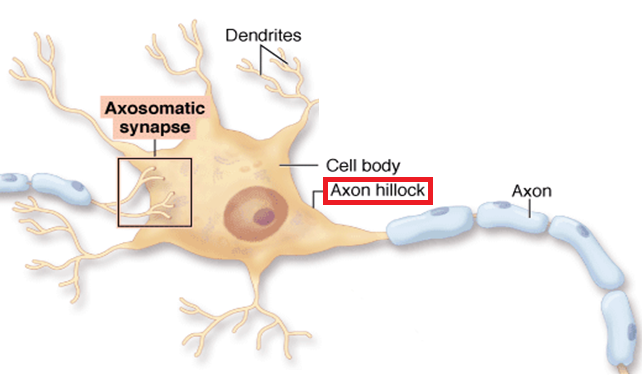
A neural connection is formed when an axosomatic synapse is created

==== Adult expression ====
In a study done in rat spinal cords, increased netrin-1, UNC-5 homologue levels were observed compared to lower levels measured in the embryo. From this study multiple mRNA transcripts were detected by northern blot analysis. This finding suggests that netrin receptors could be encoded by alternatively spliced mRNAs. During embryonic development only one splice variant is detected while there are two in the adult model. The results of these findings suggest that UNC-5 homologues make up a primary method of netrin-1 signal transduction in the adult spinal cord. This shows that netrin-1 plays a major role in the adult brain and has the potential for therapeutic applications.

=== Plasticity ===
Similar to growth cone guidance, synapse formation is cued by UNC-5 through a UNC-6 gradient that repels the dorsal axon migration. Dendritic filopodia extend from the dendritic shaft during synaptogenesis and appear as though they are reaching out for a presynaptic axon. Despite the appearance of attaching to an axon, cell signaling is still required for complete synaptic formation. An experiment was performed to determine the role of UNC-5 in axonal growth after spinal cord injury. The netrin is expressed by neurons in the corticospinal and rubrospinal projections, and by intrinsic neurons of the spinal cord both before and after the injury. When testing in vitro UNC-5 receptor bodies are taken from the spinal cord to neutralize netrin-1 in myelin. This increases the neurite outgrowth from UNC-5 expressing spinal motor neurons.

=== UNC-129 ===
UNC-129 is a ligand in the transforming growth factor family in C. elegans which encodes transforming growth factor β (TGF-β). Like UNC-6 it guides pioneer axons along the dorsoventral axis of C. elegans. TGF-β is expressed only in dorsal rows of body wall muscles and not ventral. Ectotopic expression of UNC-129 from the muscle results in disrupted growth cone and cell migrations. This shows that UNC-129 is responsible for mediating expression of dorsoventral polarity required for axon guidance. Recent findings have shown that UNC-129 is also responsible for long range repulsive guidance of UNC-6. This mechanism enhances UNC-40 signaling while inhibiting UNC-5 alone. This causes an increase in sensitivity in growth cones to UNC-6 as they travel up the UNC-129 gradient. UNC-129 mediates expression of dorsoventral polarity information required for axon guidance and guided cell migrations in Caenorhabditis elegans.

=== Dendritic self avoidance ===
Recently it was found that dendrites do not overlap and actively avoid each other because cell specific membrane proteins trigger mutual repulsion. In the absence of UNC-6 signaling however, dendrites failed to repel each other. This finding supports the idea that UNC-6 is critical for axon and dendritic guidance in the developmental stage. It is also known that self avoidance requires UNC-6 but not a UNC-6 graded signal. A ventral to dorsal UNC-6 gradient is not required for expression and dendritic self avoidance is independent of such a gradient. UNC-6 that binds to UNC-40 takes on different properties and functions as a short range guidance cue.

=== Vertebrate laminins ===
Netrins share the same terminal structure with vertebrate laminins but appear minimally related. The basement membrane assembly across species, Vertebrate laminin-1 (α1β1γ1) and laminin-10 (α5β1γ1), like the two Caenorhabditis elegans laminins, are embryonically expressed and are essential for basement membrane assembly. During the basement assembly process laminins anchor to the cell surface through their G domains after polymerizing through their LN domains. Netrins are involved in heterotropic LN domain interactions during this process which suggests that although similar in structure, the functions of the two families are different.

== Applications ==
=== Tumorigenesis ===
Netrin-1 and its receptors DCC and UNC-5 show a new mechanism for induction or suppression regulation of apoptosis. Evidence shows that this signaling pathway in humans is frequently inactivated. During the last 15 years, controversial data has failed to firmly establish whether DCC is indeed a tumour suppressor gene. However, the recent observations that DCC triggers cell death and is a receptor for netrin-1, a molecule recently implicated in colorectal tumorigenesis. The established role of DCC and netrin-1 during organization of the spinal cord could be viewed as a further challenge to the position that DCC inactivation might play a significant role in tumorigenesis. Recent observations on DCC's functions in intracellular signaling have renewed interest in the potential contribution of DCC inactivation to cancer. Data shows that, when engaged by netrin ligands, DCC may activate downstream signaling pathways and in settings where netrin is absent or at low levels, DCC can promote apoptosis. The binding of netrin-1 to its receptors inhibits the tumor suppressor p53 dependent apoptosis. Such receptors share the property of inducing apoptosis in the absence of ligand, hence creating a cellular state of dependence on the ligand. Thus, netrin-1 may not only be a chemotropic factor for neurons but also a survival factor. This discovery shows that netrin-1 receptor pathways play an important role in tumorigenesis.

=== Schwann cells ===
A study was performed to determine the effect of netrin-1 on schwann cell proliferation. Unc5b is the sole receptor expressed in RT4 schwannoma cells and adult primary Schwann cells, and netrin-1 and Unc5b are found to be expressed in the injured sciatic nerve. It was also found that the netrin-1-induced Schwann cell proliferation was blocked by the specific inhibition of Unc5b expression with RNAi. These data suggests that netrin-1 could be an endogenous trophic factor for Schwann cells in the injured peripheral nerves.

== See also ==
- Netrin
- Neural development
- Axon guidance
- Pioneer axon
- Neural development in humans
- Human brain development timeline
