= Netrin 1 =

Protein-coding gene in the species Homo sapiens

NTN1
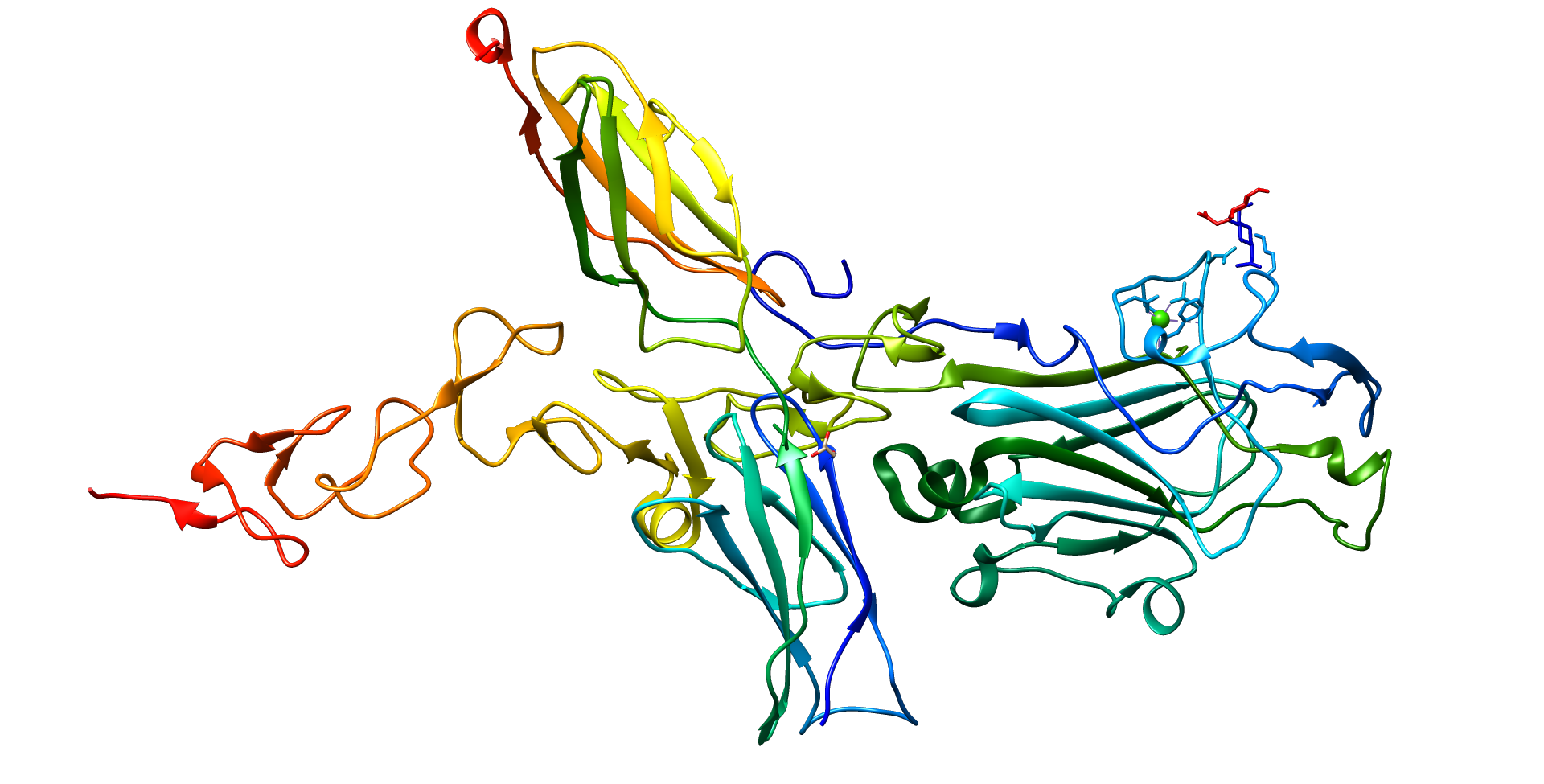
Available structures
PDB	Ortholog search: O95631 PDBe O95631 RCSB
PDB	List of PDB id codes 4URT

Identifiers
- Aliases: NTN1, NTN1L, netrin 1, MRMV4
- External IDs: OMIM: 601614; MGI: 105088; HomoloGene: 21008; GeneCards: NTN1; OMA:NTN1 - orthologs

Gene location (Human)
Chr.	Chromosome 17 (human)
Band	17p13.1	Start	9,021,510 bp
Band	17p13.1	End	9,244,000 bp

Gene location (Mouse)
Chr.	Chromosome 11 (mouse)
Band	11|11 B3	Start	68,100,190 bp
Band	11|11 B3	End	68,291,649 bp
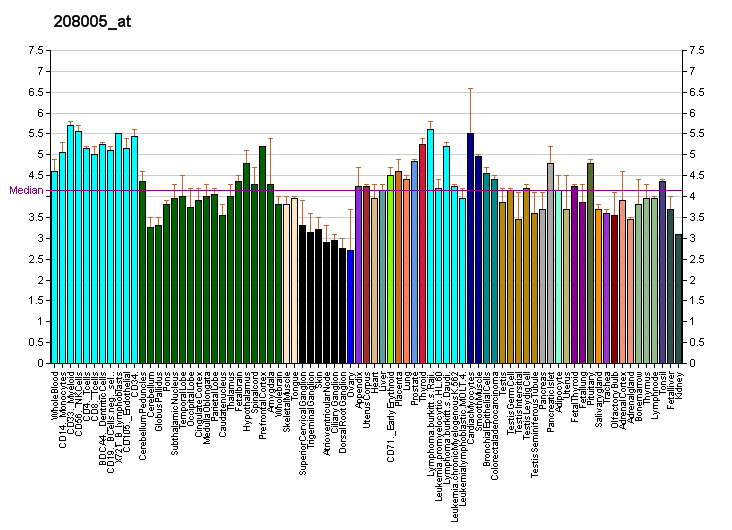
RNA expression pattern
Bgee	Human / Mouse (ortholog); Top expressed in: gastric mucosa; right auricle of heart; Descending thoracic aorta; ascending aorta; popliteal artery; tibial arteries; olfactory zone of nasal mucosa; apex of heart; parotid gland; mucosa of esophagus / Top expressed in: Cerebral white matter; tunica media of zone of aorta; ankle joint; ankle; dermis; ascending aorta; vas deferens; aortic valve; atrium; myocardium of ventricle; More reference expression data
BioGPS	More reference expression data
Gene ontology
Molecular function	protein binding
Cellular component	extracellular region; cytoplasm; basement membrane
Biological process	mammary gland duct morphogenesis; positive regulation of cell motility; axon guidance; substrate-dependent cell migration, cell extension; Cdc42 protein signal transduction; positive regulation of axon extension; inner ear morphogenesis; negative regulation of axon extension; apoptotic process; mammary gland development; positive regulation of cell population proliferation; regulation of cell migration; Ras protein signal transduction; anterior/posterior axon guidance; neuron migration; axonogenesis; nuclear migration; cell-cell adhesion; negative regulation of netrin-activated signaling pathway; regulation of synapse assembly; chemorepulsion of axon; motor neuron axon guidance; animal organ morphogenesis; tissue development; dendrite development
Sources:Amigo / QuickGO
Orthologs
Species	Human	Mouse
Entrez	9423	18208
Ensembl	ENSG00000065320	ENSMUSG00000020902
UniProt	H7BZF4; O95631	O09118
RefSeq (mRNA)	NM_004822	NM_008744
RefSeq (protein)	NP_004813	NP_032770
Location (UCSC)	Chr 17: 9.02 – 9.24 Mb	Chr 11: 68.1 – 68.29 Mb
PubMed search
- Wikidata
View/Edit Human	View/Edit Mouse

Netrin-1 is a protein that in humans is encoded by the NTN1 gene.

Netrin is included in a family of laminin-related secreted proteins. The function of this gene has not yet been defined; however, netrin is thought to be involved in axon guidance and cell migration during development. Mutations and loss of expression of netrin suggest that variation in netrin may be involved in cancer development.

== Interactions ==
NTN1 has been shown to interact with Deleted in Colorectal Cancer, and components of the extracellular matrix and the tumor microenvironment.

== Midline crossing of commissural axons ==
During the development of the central nervous system, when the dorsal and ventral signaling is being established, the floor plate is an important site for crossing for groups of neural processes at the dorsal midline. Once crossed through the floor plate, these groups are now referred to as commissural axons. These neuronal cell bodies are signaled by Netrin 1 to be attracted to the floor plate from the dorsal half of the neural tube. NTN1 is a gene that encodes for the protein, Netrin-1. In a study done in knockout mice with a depletion of floor plate Netrin-1, it was shown that corticospinal axon tract midline crossing was disrupted. This study was done to show characteristics of patients with human congenital mirror movement disorder.

Afterwards, proper positioning of axons and midline crossing are pioneered by the Slit-Robo system where Slit proteins act as axonal repellents and Robo proteins (Robo-1, Robo-2, Robo-3) act in conjunction with Slit ligands to be their receptors. Slit with Robo-1 and Robo-2 repel axonal extension at the midline thereby commissural axons expressing Robo-3 cross the midline by interfering with Slit/Robo-1, Robo-2 repulsive activity. After crossing the floor plate, Robo-3 is downregulated and Slit/Robo-1, Robo-2 continue to express their repulsiveness at the midline. Furthermore, mutations in Robo-3 cause horizontal gaze palsy with progressive scoliosis.
