= Chemorepulsion =

Directional movement of a cell away from a substance

Chemorepulsion is the directional movement of a cell away from a substance. Of the two directional varieties of chemotaxis, chemoattraction has been studied to a much greater extent. Only recently have the key components of the chemorepulsive pathway been elucidated. The exact mechanism is still being investigated, and its constituents are currently being explored as likely candidates for immunotherapies.

Cell Migration Glossary
• Chemotaxis Cellular response to an environmental substance with a directional movement.
• Chemokinesis Cellular response to an environmental substance with a random, non-vectorial movement.
• Chemoattraction Directional cell movement towards a substance
• Chemorepulsion Directional cell movement away from a substance
• Chemokines Secreted cell-signaling proteins able to induce chemotaxis in nearby cells.
• Immunorepulsion The active movement of immune cells away from a substance

== History and etymology ==
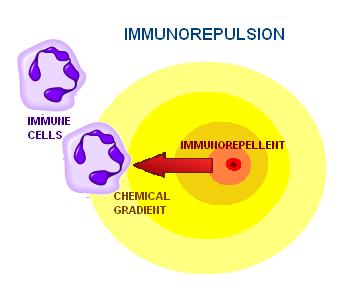
Neutrophils being repelled from a chemokinetic agent

The mechanism of the chemorepulsion of immune cells was first acknowledged by medical researchers at the Massachusetts General Hospital in Boston in early 2002. The phenomenon was originally referred to as "reverse chemotaxis," and later, “fugetaxis” (derived from the Latin words fugere, to flee from; and taxis, movement). For a time, the words were used interchangeably before being replaced almost exclusively by “chemorepulsion.” While "chemorepulsion" applies to all cell types, the term "immunorepulsion" is gaining momentum as a more specific term that only applies to hematopoietic blood cell types that are involved in immune responses. Different cell types to which the term "immunorepulsion" could potentially be applied include: Myeloid lineage cells (monocytes, macrophages, neutrophils, basophils, eosinophils, erythrocytes, platelets, dendritic cells) and Lymphoid lineage cells (T-cells, B-cells, NK-cells).

== Role in physiological processes ==
The chemorepulsion of immune cells was first postulated a priori based on the established migratory behavior of cells evidenced in several naturally occurring physiological processes: the development of the Central Nervous System, the establishment of immune-privileged sites, and thymic emigration.

=== Central nervous system development ===
During the development of the Central Nervous System, chemokinetic agents influence the localization of neuronal cells by either attracting or repelling the growing axon. This mechanism of context-dependent bidirectionality serves as a valuable model of chemorepulsion that can be studied in vivo. Additionally, there is growing evidence that chemorepulsion is probably a key mechanism involved in regulating leukocyte motility. Many of the chemorepellents that affect neuronal cell migration, including netrins, semaphorins, slit ligands, and ephrins have recently been implicated in the motility of immune cells. For example, the Slit protein that mediates axonal chemorepulsion has also been shown to inhibit the directed migration of leukocytes in response to chemoattractants. Other factors might also provide chemorepulsive effects on immune cells, and these inhibitory effects might be regulated by the tissue microenvironment.

=== Immune-privileged sites ===
Certain body tissues are able to tolerate antigens without an inflammatory immune response. Immune privilege is thought to be an evolutionary adaptation to protect the most vital sensory organs and reproductive structures that would be otherwise severely impaired during an inflammatory response. Although these locations are often physically isolated or segregated from access by immune cells, there are some functionally significant characteristics of such environments that are unique, and could potentially be replicated to keep immune cells away from targeted areas. Known immunologically privileged sites include the:

1. Brain and central nervous system
2. Eyes
3. Placenta and fetus
4. Testicles

Characteristics that are particular to immune-privileged sites should be seriously considered when investigating candidates for immunorepulsion therapy. These characteristics include:

1. Low expression of Classical MHC Class IA molecules.
2. Expression of immunoregulatory Nonclassical MHC Class IB molecules.
3. Increased expression of surface molecules that inhibit complement activation.
4. Local production of immunosuppressive cytokines, such as TGF-β
5. Presence of neuropeptides.
6. Expression of Fas ligand that controls the entry of Fas-expressing lymphoid cells.

=== Thymic emigration ===
T-cells are one of the most critical constituents of the adaptive immune system due to their ability to continue developing after activation. To prevent premature instigation, it is necessary for T-cells to mature in an environment completely isolated from any potentially activating factors (antigens, cytokines, steroids, receptor antagonists, adhesion molecules, etc.). As a result, T-cells are formed in the bone marrow and subsequently migrate to the cortex of the thymus where they can mature in an antigen-free environment. The thymus supports the differentiation of multiple distinct T cell subsets that play unique roles in the immune system. For example, T-helper, T-cytotoxic, T-memory, and T-suppressor cells all develop in the thymus and must leave it to provide their functions elsewhere in the body during an immune response. In vitro models of the T-lymphopoiesis system have revealed that the emigration of mature T-cells occurs as a result of immunorepulsion away from a chemokinetic agent generated from within the thymic organ via a G-protein coupled receptor.

== Role in pathological processes ==
=== Viral and bacterial immune evasion ===
Pathogens have evolved various strategies of evasion to thwart the host’s mobilization of immune cells, some of which are relevant to immunrepulsion. For example, some microbes actively seek out and infect immune-privileged tissues where the immune response is not active. Others produce immunomodulatory proteins that interfere with the host’s normal immune system response. These proteins function by modulating elements of the host:

1. Complement system and inflammatory response
2. Cytokine network
3. Antigen processing and presentation pathway

Historically, the active sites of immunomodulatory proteins have suggested relevant targets for conventional immunotherapies. In the current paradigm, these targets also harbor potential for innovative immunorepulsion therapies.

=== Cancer immune evasion ===
Cancer cells leverage the chemorepulsion of immune cells to evade recognition and destruction by immune cells. Without a targeted immune response, the cancer cells can proliferate and even metastasize. Studies have been conducted to investigate which chemokines are secreted by tumors that allow them to evade response so diligently. One study showed that high expression of SDF-1 was responsible for the down-regulation of MHC class I molecules, which significantly interferes with tumor antigen recognition. Further investigations of high SDF-1 activity indicate that tumors eventually establish an immune privileged site through repulsion of tumor-specific lymphocytes.

Potentially clinically relevant cancer chemokines include:

1. IL-8: Many cancers have been found to produce and express IL-8. Binding of IL-8 to CXCR1 and CXCR2 receptors has been associated with tumor establishment.
2. SDF-1: Other cancers express high levels of SDF-1, which stimulates tumor growth and disrupts normal immune cell trafficking.

== Pharmacological relevance ==
=== Inflammation ===
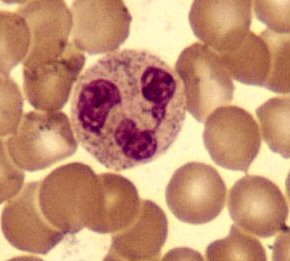
Neutrophils are critical constituents of the innate immune system

Inflammation is one of the first responses of the immune system to infection or irritation. The response is stimulated by chemical factors released by injured cells. These chemical factors induce all associated inflammatory symptoms by sensitizing pain receptors, causing vasodilation of the blood vessels at the scene, and attracting phagocytes.

Neutrophils are the first to the scene, triggering other parts of the immune system by releasing factors to summon other leukocytes and lymphocytes. Other innate leukocytes include natural killer cells, mast cells, eosinophils, basophils, macrophages, and dendritic cells. These cells function in concert by identifying and eliminating pathogens that might cause infection.

As first responders, the innate immune cells cannot afford to be specific, and must respond to foreign substances in a generic way. Neutrophils, for example, contain toxic substances in their granules that kill or hinder the expansion of pathogens. The cells attack pathogens by releasing strong oxidizing agents including hydrogen peroxide, free oxygen radicals, and hypochlorite. Although the attack is effective against bacteria and fungi, the response can inadvertently inflict severe damage to the surrounding host tissue. The misregulation of innate immune cells plays a key role in promulgating inflammatory conditions.

Chemorepulsion is currently being explored as a practicable therapy for the prevention or resolution of unwanted inflammatory responses. A chemorepellent functions by conveying chemical signals to immune cells that instruct them to leave or stay away from a targeted area or tissue in order to restore the tissue to a normal state.

=== Graft rejections ===
The objective of using chemorepulsion therapy in transplantation medicine is to procure sustainable, site-specific unresponsiveness for the prevention of graft rejection. Current therapies achieve rejection control by indiscriminately suppressing the immune response. In this approach, any benefits achieved by immunosuppression are overcome by increasing the patient's risk of deadly, opportunistic infections. If attainable, constitutive expression of chemorepellents by the donor tissue would create an inducible immune-privileged site for the allograft, and would be an effective alternative treatment for graft rejection prevention.

== Mechanism ==
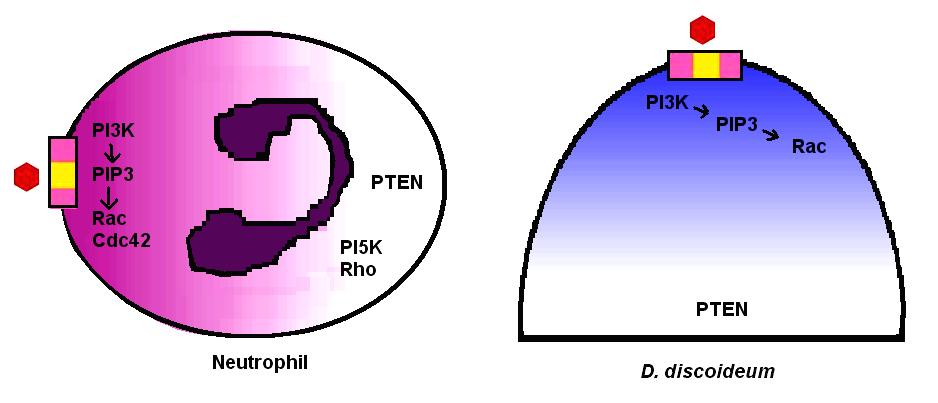
Along the PIP3 gradient, the signaling pathway is highly conserved between D.discoideum and human neutrophils

Chemorepulsion is enabled by the same gradient-sensing capability that governs chemotaxis. The gradient signal of the chemokinetic agent is received through specific receptors on the cell surface and is transduced through intracellular machinery to generate the directional response. The cell moves up a gradient of a chemoattractant or down a gradient of a chemorepellent. In addition to axon growth cones, the model organism Dictyostelium discoideum has been instrumental in determining the mechanisms that mediate chemorepulsion and immunorepulsion. The mechanisms of gradient-sensing and cell polarization in D. discoideum are remarkably conserved in human neutrophils.

=== Bidirectional decisions ===
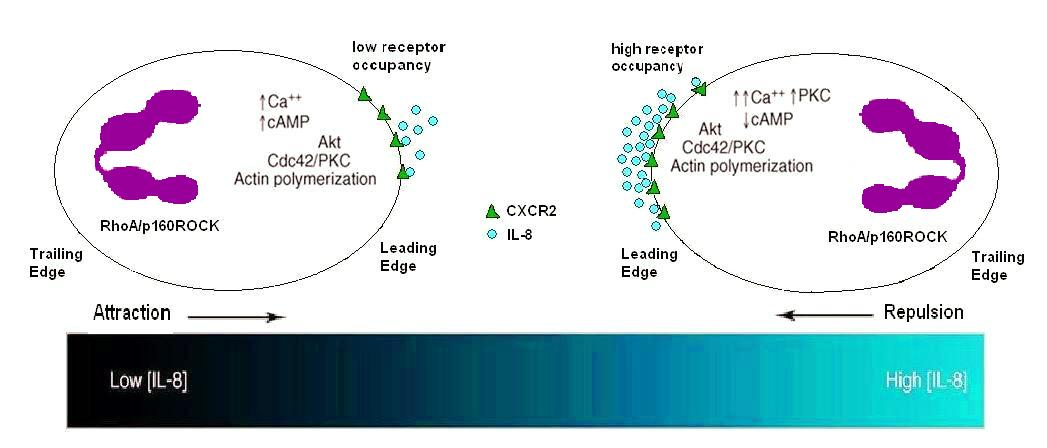
Directional Decision Making Mechanism in a Human Neutrophil

Leukocytes can exhibit active chemorepulsion away from a factor that is normally considered to stimulate chemoattraction depending on the context. For example, lymphocytes can migrate away from a high concentration of the chemokine SDF-1 rather than be attracted by lower concentrations of the same factor. Similar results have been reported for human neutrophils to the chemokine IL-8.

• The directional decision to move towards or away from a chemokine appears to be determined by:
• Differential receptor occupancy
• Intracellular kinase activation
• Cyclic nucleotide concentrations

=== Signaling pathways ===
Abbreviations Legend
• PI3K Phosphoinositide 3-kinase
• PLC Phospholipase C
• cAMP Cyclic adenosine monophosphate, a chemoattractant
• 8CPT-cAMP 8-para-chlorphenylthio, a chemorepellent
• IP-3 Inositol trisphosphate
• Pt dIns(3,4,5)P_{3} Phosphatidylinositol (3,4,5)-triphosphate
• SDF-1 Stromal cell-derived factor 1

In both D. discoideum and human neutrophils, there is a reversal of polarity that occurs when converting from a chemoattraction to a chemorepulsion response. Evidenced chemotaxis models have been observed using cAMP analogs. During cAMP-mediated chemoattraction, the chemoattractant cAMP acti vates PI3K at the leading edge along with the localized activation of the small GTPases Rac and Cdc42. This in turn activates PLC which leads to the generation of IP-3, which results in a loss of PtdIns(4,5)P_{2} at the leading edge. The chemorepellent 8CPT-cAMP inhibits PLC activity and thereby increases Ptds(3,4,5)P_{3} accumulation and activation of PTEN. In this manner, the chemorepellant reverses the polarity of the PtdIns(3,4,5)P_{3} gradient and induces chemorepulsion. Recent evidence also implicates a role for PI5K and Rho signaling during directional decision making and migration.

=== Inhibitors ===
Useful inhibitors have been investigated in T cells. For example, T cell chemoattraction to SDF-1 is inhibited by the tyrosine kinase inhibitors, genistein and herbimycin.
