= Chemotropism =

Biological process

Chemotropism is defined as the growth of organisms navigated by chemical stimulus from outside of the organism. It has been observed in bacteria, plants and fungi. A chemical gradient can influence the growth of the organism in a positive or negative way. Positive growth is characterized by growing towards a stimulus and negative growth is growing away from the stimulus.

Chemotropism is slightly different from Chemotaxis, the major difference being that chemotropism is related to growth, while chemotaxis is related to locomotion. A chemotropic process may have an underlying chemotactic component, as is the case with mating yeast.

== Chemotropism in plants ==
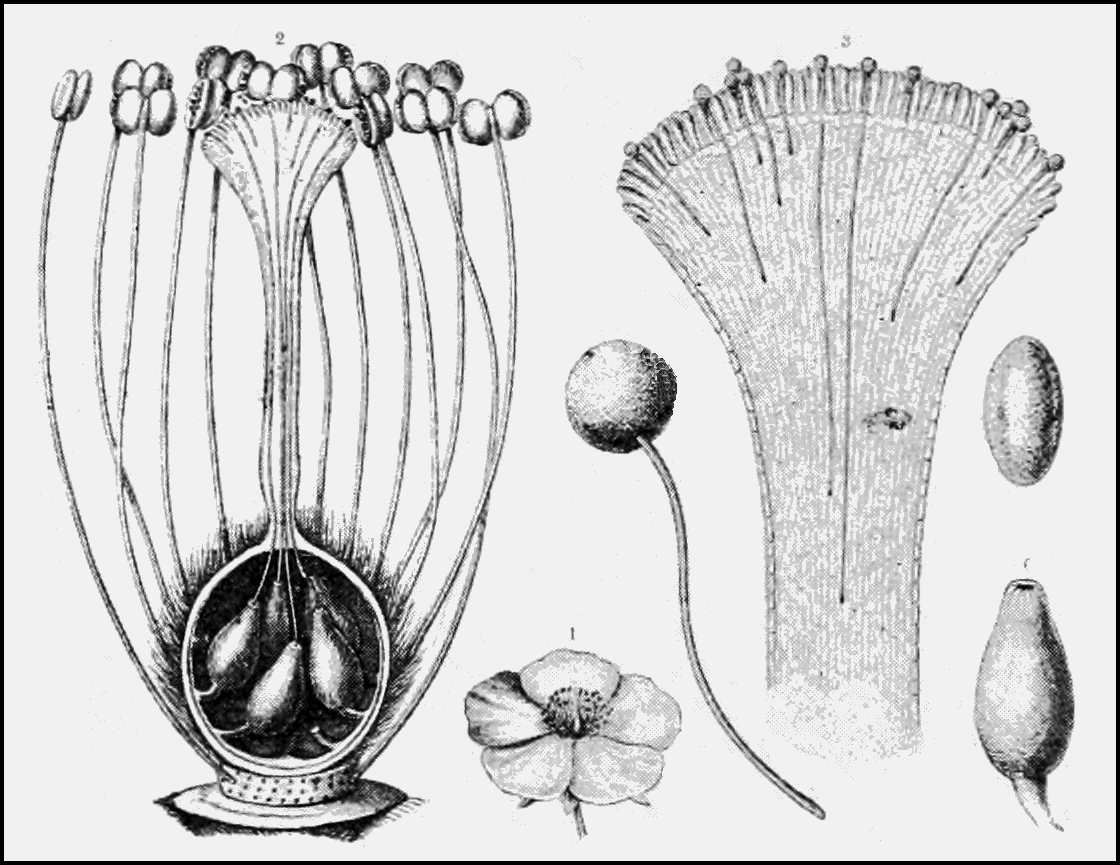
PSM V77 D352 The course of the pollen tube in a rock rose

One prime example of chemotropism is seen in plant fertilization and pollen tube elongation of angiosperms, flowering plants. Unlike animals, plants cannot move, and therefore need a delivery mechanism for sexual reproduction. Pollen, which contains the male gametophyte is transferred to another plant via insects or wind. If the pollen is compatible it will germinate and begin to grow. The ovary releases chemicals that stimulates a positive chemotropic response from the developing pollen tube. In response the tube develops a defined tip growth area that promotes directional growth and elongation of the pollen tube due to a calcium gradient. The steep calcium gradient is localized in the tip and promotes elongation and orientation of the growth. This calcium gradient is essential for the growth to occur; it has been shown that inhibiting the formation of the gradient results in no growth. As the pollen tube continues to grow towards the ovules, the male sperm remains in the apical region and is transported to the female ovule. The pollen tube elongates at a rate comparable to neurite development

An example of positive and negative chemotropism is shown by a plant's roots; the roots grow towards useful minerals displaying positive chemotropism, and grow away from harmful acids displaying negative chemotropism.

== Chemotropism in animals ==
In more complex organisms an example of chemotropic movement includes the growth of individual neuronal cell axons in response to extracellular signals. Secreted protein can either repel or attract specific neurons. Some signal proteins such as netrins, semaphorins, neurotrophins and fibroblast growth factors have been identified in aiding neuronal growth. These signals guide the developing axon to innervate the correct target tissue. The neuronal growth cones are guided by gradients of chemoattractant molecules released from their intermediate or final targets. There is evidence that the axons of peripheral neurons are guided by chemotropism and the directed growth of some central axons is also a chemotropic response, it remains to be determined whether chemotropism also operates in the central nervous system. Evidence has also been noted in neuronal regeneration, where chemotropic substances guide the ganglionic neurites towards the degenerated neuronal stump.

== Chemotropism in Fungi ==
Chemotropism seen in Yeast. Haploid Yeast cells release a- and α-factors that bind to the receptors of another haploid Yeast cell. The two Yeast cells fuse together to form an a/α diploid zygote.

Fungal chemotropism was first reported over 100 years ago by Anton de Bary. One example of fungi using chemotropism is seen in Yeast.Yeast release chemical pheromones in order to attract mates. Each haploid yeast cells express specific haploid genes; haploid α-cells express α-genes and haploid a-cells express a-genes. Each cell type releases a unique pheromone: a- or α-factor. By secreting these factors a chemical gradient is formed that attracts the other type of yeast cell during mating. In order for the yeast to sense the gradient they have to have proper receptors that bind a- or α-factor: Ste3 and Ste2 respectively. The receptors to detect the pheromones are seven transmembrane G-protein coupled receptor (GPCR). Once activated, there is a signaling cascade that results in the activation of transcription factors for mating-specific genes such as those involved in cell cycle arrest, directional polarization towards the chemical gradient, and sexual hyphae formation. When fungal hyphae touch, the cells merge to form a diploid zygote. Mating pairs of budding yeast cells may polarize away from each other, but are able to adjust the location of polarity to enable successful alignment and fusion.

== See also ==
- Chemotaxis
- Chemoreceptor
- Mechanism
