= Netrin =

Class of proteins involved in axon guidance

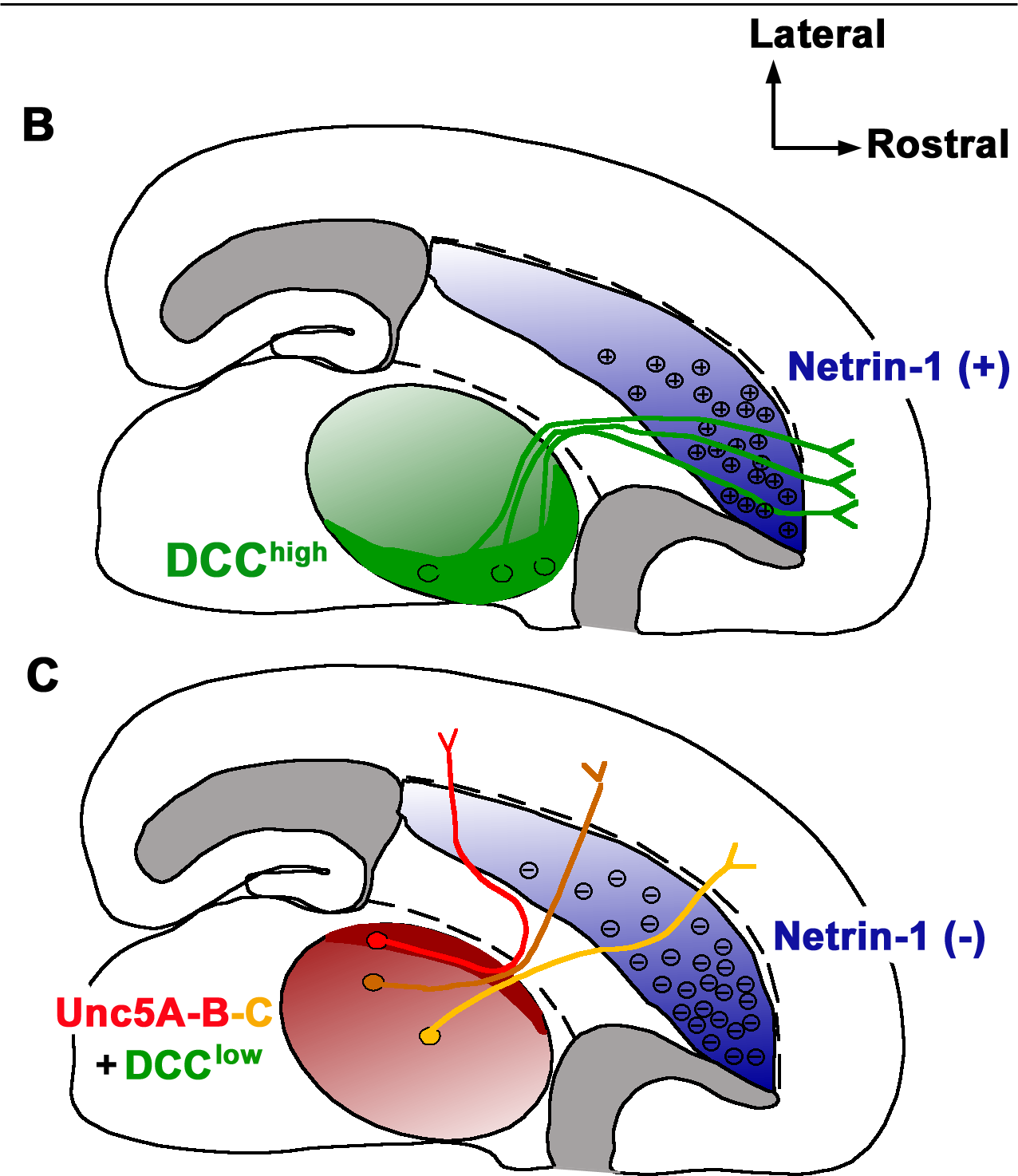
Netrin 1 knockout disrupts thalamocortical projections topography in the mouse brain. From Powell et al., 2008.

Netrins are a class of proteins involved in axon guidance. They are named after the Sanskrit word "netr", which means "one who guides". Netrins are genetically conserved across nematode worms, fruit flies, frogs, mice, and humans. Structurally, netrin resembles the extracellular matrix protein laminin.

Netrins are chemotropic; a growing axon will either move towards or away from a higher concentration of netrin. Though the detailed mechanism of axon guidance is not fully understood, it is known that netrin attraction is mediated through UNC-40/DCC cell surface receptors and repulsion is mediated through UNC-5 receptors. Netrins also act as growth factors, encouraging cell growth activities in target cells. Mice deficient in netrin fail to form the hippocampal comissure or the corpus callosum.

A proposed model for netrin activity in the spinal column of developing human embryos is that netrins are released by the floor plate and then are picked up by receptor proteins embedded in the growth cones of axons belonging to neurons in the developing spinal column. The bodies of these neurons remain stationary while the axons follow a path defined by netrins, eventually connecting to neurons inside the embryonic brain by developing synapses. Research supports that new axons tend to follow previously traced pathways rather than being guided by netrins or related chemotropic factors.

== Discovery ==
Netrin was first described in the nematode Caenorhabditis elegans in 1990, and named UNC-6, according to standard C. elegans naming protocol. The first mammalian homologue of UNC-6 was discovered in 1994, where it was discovered to be a vital guidance cue for rodent commissural axons in the spinal cord. As of 2009, five mammalian Netrins have been identified. Netrins 1, 3, and 4 are secreted proteins, whereas G1 and G2 are membrane bound proteins tethered by Glycophosphatidylinositol tails. All netrins discovered in invertebrates thus far are secreted.

== Overview of netrins ==
The netrin family is composed mostly of secreted proteins which serve as bifunctional signals: attracting some neurons while repelling others during the development of the brain. Expressed in the midline of all animals possessing bilateral symmetry, they can act as long or short range signals during neurogenesis. In order to carry out their functions, netrins interact with specific receptors: DCC or UNC-5, depending on whether they are trying to attract or repel neurons, respectively.

There is a high degree of conservation in the secondary structure of netrins, which has several domains which are homologous with laminin at the amino terminal end. The C-terminal domain is where most of the variation is found between species and contains different amino acids which allow interaction with specific proteins in extracellular matrix or on the cell surface. The differences in terms of structure and function have led to the identifications of several different types of netrins including netrin-1, netrin-3, and netrins-G.

=== Key netrins ===
Netrin-1 is found in the floor plate and neuroepithelial cells of the ventral region of the spinal cord, as well as other locations in the nervous system including the somatic mesoderm, pancreas and cardiac muscle. Its main role is in axonal guidance, neuronal migration and morphogenesis of different branching structures. Mice with mutations in the netrin-1 gene were observed to be lacking in forebrain and spinal cord commissural axons. Netrin-1 and -3 has been described to have an exclusive expression in cancer cells.

Netrin-3 is different from other netrins. While expressed during development of the peripheral nervous system in the motor, sensory and sympathetic neurons, it is very limited in the central nervous system. Studies with netrin-3 have noticed a reduced ability to bind with DCC when compared with netrin-1. This suggests that it mainly operates through other receptors.

Netrins-G are secreted but remain bound to the extracellular surface of the cell membrane through Glycophosphatidylinositol (GPI). They are expressed predominantly in the central nervous system in places such as the thalamus and mitral cells of the olfactory bulb. They do not bind to DCC or UNC-5 and instead bind to ligand NGL-1, which results in an intracellular transduction cascade. The two versions, netrin-G1 and netrin-G2, are found only in vertebrates. It is believed that they evolved independently of other netrins in order to facilitate the construction of the brain.

=== Netrin receptors ===
DCC and UNC-5 proteins mediate netrin-1 responses. The UNC-5 protein is mainly involved in signaling repulsion. DCC, which is implicated in attraction, can also serve as a co-factor in repulsion signaling when far away from the source of netrin-1. DCC is highly expressed in the central nervous system and associated with the basal lamina of epithelial cells. In the absence of netrin-1, these receptors are known to induce apoptosis.

== Axonal guidance ==
Growth cones that are located at the end of developing axons during embryogenesis are responsible for the elongation of the axon during migration. Elongation occurs in response to both tropic and atropic factors present in the surrounding environment. Netrins are one such tropic factor secreted by axonal target cells that function as a crucial axonal guidance protein in both vertebrate and invertebrate organisms. Studies in multiple organisms including, mice, rats, chicks, the nematode Caenorhabditis elegans, the fruit fly Drosophila melanogaster and the zebrafish Danio rerio have indicated that secreted netrins are bifunctional, meaning that they can act as either attractants or repellants in directing axonal extension. In addition, many studies have characterized netrins as both short and long range cues, acting in the immediate or distant vicinity of their source cell (the axonal target cell).

=== Attraction ===
Studies of central nervous system (CNS) development in chick and rodent models have identified the netrin-1 protein as a particularly important vertebrate axonal guidance cue. Most significantly, it was observed that the specialized cells of the floor plate located at the ventral midline of the embryonic brain secrete netrin-1, which resulted in a protein gradient. This gradient is most concentrated at the ventral midline and becomes increasingly diffuse as you move dorsally. Additional research in netrin deficient mice found that when netrin associates with the Deleted in Colorectal Cancer (DCC) receptor on the axonal growth cone an attractant response is initiated. This was further supported by an observed absence of ventral commissure (i.e. corpus callosum) development in mice lacking either netrin-1 or DCC. Similar results were observed in experiments with the netrin-1 homolog UNC-6 discovered in C. elegans The same early expression and formation of a protein concentration gradient emanating from the ventral midline is observed in epidermal cells of the developing worm. Evidence suggests that this gradient is essential for the long-range function of UNC-6 in guiding the initial circumferential migration of axons to the ventral midline and that the UNC-40 receptor mediates the attractive response. As additional axons reach the midline, the temporal and spatial expression of UNC-6 becomes increasing restricted, indicating that after a more general dorsal-ventral guidance of axons, UNC-6 is further involved in directing axons to more specific locations.

Recently, scientists have characterized many of the cellular mechanisms by which netrin-1 binding to DCC motivates axonal attraction through at least three independent signaling pathways. In all three pathways netrin-1 is observed to cause the homodimerization of DCC that begins the chemoattraction cascade. In the first pathway, the focal adhesion kinase (FAK) is bound to DCC and both undergo tyrosine phosphorylation upon netrin-1 binding that induces the recruitment and phosphorylation of Src and Fyn, which is hypothesized to lead to an increase in second messengers Rac1 and Cdc42 thereby promoting growth cone extension. In a second possible pathway, phosphatidylinositol transfer protein α (PITP) binds to phosphorylated DCC which induces phospholipase C (PLC) to increase the ratio of cAMP to cGMP. This increase of cAMP relative to cGMP activates L-type Ca^{2+} channels as well as transient receptor potential channels (TRPC's) causing an influx of extracellular Ca^{2+}. Evidence suggests that this increased calcium is responsible for the activation of Rho GTPases, Cdc42 Rac1 and the nuclear transcription factor NFAT which can all initiate growth cone extension. Additional studies have also shown that netrin-induced signaling between DCC downstream targets NcK, and Wiskott–Aldrich syndrome protein WASP trigger Rac1 and Cdc42 and subsequently axonal growth.

=== Repulsion ===
Both DCC in vertebrates and UNC-40 in C. elegans have been shown to initiate a repulsive rather than attractive response when associated with the netrin receptor Unc5. In the same ventral midline gradient discussed above, netrin-1 acts as a chemorepellant for axons of the trochlear motor neurons, thus directing their growth dorsally (away from the ventral midline). Antibody inhibition of DCC in embryonic Xenopus spinal cord inhibited both attraction and repulsion in vitro. Likewise, multiple defects were observed in C. elegans unc-40 mutants; however, errors in migration patterns were more profoundly affected by mutations in the unc-5 gene, indicating that binding of the netrin-1 homologue UNC-6 to the UNC-5 receptor alone can repel axonal growth. In both vertebrate and invertebrate systems, short range chemorepulsion in which the concentration of netrins is high, seems to primarily occur via the UNC-5 receptor, while long range repulsive effects at more diffuse concentrations require coordination between DCC (UNC-40 in C.elegans) and UNC-5.

It is currently hypothesized that long range chemorepulsion involves initiation of the Arachidonic acid pathway upon netrin-1 interaction with the DCC/UNC-5 complex. This pathway increases the intracellular levels of 12-HPETE (12-Hydroperoxy-5, 8, 10, 14-Eicosatetraenoic Acid), which induces cGMP signaling and subsequently causes a decrease in the cAMP/cGMP ratio. Reducing this ratio inhibits calcium conductance through the L-type calcium channels (LCC) and ultimately results in growth cone repulsion though a possible activation of Ras homolog gene family, member A (RhoA). A similar RhoA-mediated mechanism is proposed for short range chemorepulsion whereby netrin-1 binding to UNC-5 homodimers alone induces tyrosine phosphorylation requiring FAK and Src, which as a result activates RhoA. An additional mechanism proposes that binding of the tyrosine phosphatase Shp2 to the netrin-1/UNC-5 complex may also trigger chemorepulsion through RhoA.

== Glial and mesodermal guidance ==
Many studies have shown that netrin-1, UNC-40, UNC-6, and UNC-5 are involved in the migration of glia during embryogenesis. During the migratory phase in Drosophila melanogaster, embryonic peripheral glia (ePG) express UNC-5. In UNC-5 knockout organisms, ePG either stall while migrating or fail to migrate. UNC-6 signaling in C. elegans, coupled with the UNC-40 receptor on neurons, promotes synaptogenesis and assembles the glial endfeet around the synapse.

== Functions outside of neuronal guidance ==
Although originally understood to be specifically involved in axonal guidance in the central nervous system, new research has linked netrin to cancer regulation, the development and formation of non-neural tissue, and the detection of cancer and other diseases.

=== Development and regulation of tissue ===
Netrin has been discovered to play a key role in the development and mature regulation of tissue outside the nervous system. Some of the non-neural tissues implicated include lung, placental, vasculature, pancreas, muscle and mammary gland tissue. Netrin contributes to tissue morphogenesis by controlling developing cell migration and cell adhesion in different organs.

In developing mammary glands, the growing tips of the ductal network consist of two layers made up of luminal epithelial cells and cap cells. The luminal cells secrete netrin 1, which binds to the receptor neogenin (a homologue of DCC) on the cap cells. This allows for adhesion between the two cell layers, which is necessary for the proper morphogenesis of the terminal end buds (TEBs) in the mammary glands. Loss of the gene coding for either netrin 1 or neogenin leads to the improper formation of the (TEBs), suggesting that rather than acting as a guidance molecule as in neuronal systems, netrin 1 serves as an adhesive in mammary tissue.

During the morphogenesis of the embryonic lung, epithelial cells express netrin 1 and netrin 4. These netrins surround endoderm buds in the basement membrane, preventing distal tip cells from expressing DCC and UNC5B. This allows for normal development of the lung and halts potentially dangerous over-branching and budding from occurring.

In pancreatic development, netrin 1 is expressed in epithelial ductal cells and localizes to the basal membrane. Netrin 1 associates with several elements in the extracellular matrix, including collagen IV, fibronectin, and integral proteins α6β4 and α3β1. These elements in the extracellular matrix are responsible for epithelial cell adhesion and migration, suggesting that netrin 1 is associated with the guidance of epithelial cells in the embryonic pancreas.

Netrin has been implicated as a vital molecule for the proliferation of vascular networks. Multiple studies have found different effects of netrin on these branching vessels. The endothelial tip cells in vascular tissue display similar properties to the growth cone found in neuronal tissue. Studies have discovered that these same endothelial tip cells also express UNC5B, which netrin 1 can bind to, inhibiting angiogenesis. In contrast, several studies show that netrin-1 actually promotes blood vessel branching. In conjunction with this research, it has been found that netrin 4 is responsible for growth in the lymphatic vascular system. Overall, these studies show that regulating effects of netrin is dependent on the type of vascular tissue. Recently, netrin has been implicated in angiogenesis in the placenta, making it vital to the survival of the fetus. This finding has implications in the future treatment of vascular disease in the placenta.

In adults, netrin has been implicated in the regulation of stem cell movement and inflammation. Netrin 1 has been found to inhibit leukocyte migration to inflamed areas in the body. This provides evidence that the up regulation of netrin protects injured tissue from excess inflammation. Also, the migration of adult neural progenitor cell and adult spinal cord progenitor cells to the spine is netrin 1 dependent. Little is known of the mechanism controlling the inhibition or attraction of these stem cells.

=== Cancer regulation and disease markers ===
In various human cancers, it has been shown that netrin becomes over-expressed. It has also been shown that certain receptors become down-regulated in this process. The netrin receptors DCC and UNC5H are responsible for apoptotic regulation. The absence of netrin 1 is responsible for apoptosis, while the presence of netrin 1 leads to an inhibition of the apoptotic pathway. This pathway is unique and independent of the mitochondrial and death receptor pathways that lead to controlled cell death. This has been observed in the human colon epithelium, where higher levels of natural cell death at the upper portion of the villi correlated with a smaller gradient of netrin-1. This linked the role of netrin with tissue death and growth. Tumor suppressor p53 is responsible for the expression of netrin-1, implying that netrin may be the pathway through which p53 regulates the cell cycle. Because netrin is so influential in the regulation of cell death, the gene which codes for netrin (NTN1) is considered to be an oncogene.

Because netrin-1 has been found to be upregulated in tumors, recent research has attempted to identify netrin-1 as a biomarker for the onset of cancer in the human body. It was found that netrin can be found at above-normal levels in the blood plasma of patients who are positive for renal, liver, prostate, meningioma of brain, pituitary adenoma, glioblastoma and breast cancer. Netrin-3 appears to be specifically expressed in Neublastoma (a paediatric tumour) and in small cell lung cancer (SCLC) where it correlates with a bad patient prognosis.

== Continued research on netrin ==
There are still many unanswered questions regarding the netrin family of molecules. It is still uncertain what role vertebrate homologues of UNC-5 play in chemorepulsion. Although much is known about the expression of netrin during development, little is yet known about its regulation in later development in the brain. Netrin knockout mice show that there is much to learn about the many roles of netrin in axonal guidance.

Another important line of current research targets netrin as a treatment for various diseases, including cancer, myocardial infarction, and Alzheimer's disease. In avian and mouse model organisms suffering from neuroblastoma, interfering with the netrin-1 autocrine loop in malignant tumors leads to cell death. This could lead to possible alternative therapies resulting from future trials. Similar treatments regarding the down-regulation of netrin-1 are also being investigated for metastatic breast and colorectal cancers. Recent studies also suggest that netrin is involved in a cardioprotective role by releasing NO gas. In mice, netrin has also been associated with the regulation of (Aβ) peptide, which is responsible for amyloid plaques in Alzheimer's disease.

== See also ==
- Neural development
- Axon guidance
- Pioneer neuron
- Pioneer axon
- Neural development in humans
- Human brain development timeline
- Roundabout gene
- Slit gene
