= Netrin receptor DCC =

Protein-coding gene in the species Homo sapiens

DCC

Identifiers
- Aliases: DCC, DCC netrin 1 receptor, CRC18, CRCR1, IGDCC1, MRMV1, NTN1R1, HGPPS2
- External IDs: OMIM: 120470; MGI: 94869; GeneCards: DCC
Available structures
PDB	Ortholog search: PDBe RCSB
PDB	List of PDB id codes 2ED7, 2ED8, 2ED9, 2EDB, 2EDD, 2EDE, 3AU4, 4URT

Gene location (Human)
Chr.	Chromosome 18 (human)
Band	18q21.2	Start	52,340,197 bp
Band	18q21.2	End	53,535,903 bp

Gene location (Mouse)
Chr.	Chromosome 18 (mouse)
Band	18 E2|18 45.24 cM	Start	71,386,705 bp
Band	18 E2|18 45.24 cM	End	72,484,140 bp
RNA expression pattern
Bgee	Human / Mouse (ortholog); Top expressed in: right testis; left testis; ganglionic eminence; testicle; gonad; prefrontal cortex; Brodmann area 23; nucleus accumbens; primary visual cortex; caudate nucleus / Top expressed in: ganglionic eminence; lumbar subsegment of spinal cord; medial ganglionic eminence; ventral tegmental area; nucleus accumbens; pineal gland; olfactory tubercle; substantia nigra; anterior amygdaloid area; mammillary body; More reference expression data
BioGPS	n/a
Gene ontology
Molecular function	protein binding; netrin receptor activity; transmembrane signaling receptor activity
Cellular component	integral component of membrane; cytosol; membrane; plasma membrane; axon; Schaffer collateral - CA1 synapse; integral component of postsynaptic density membrane
Biological process	dorsal/ventral axon guidance; negative regulation of neuron projection development; axonogenesis; netrin-activated signaling pathway; neuron migration; nervous system development; negative regulation of dendrite development; axon guidance; multicellular organism development; negative regulation of collateral sprouting; regulation of neuron death; extrinsic apoptotic signaling pathway in absence of ligand; spinal cord ventral commissure morphogenesis; anterior/posterior axon guidance; apoptotic process; negative regulation of netrin-activated signaling pathway; postsynaptic modulation of chemical synaptic transmission
Sources:Amigo / QuickGO
Orthologs
Databases	NCBI: entry; OMA: entry
Species	Human	Mouse
Entrez	1630	13176
Ensembl	ENSG00000187323	ENSMUSG00000060534
UniProt	P43146	P70211
RefSeq (mRNA)	NM_005215	NM_007831
RefSeq (protein)	NP_005206	NP_031857
Location (UCSC)	Chr 18: 52.34 – 53.54 Mb	Chr 18: 71.39 – 72.48 Mb
PubMed search
- Wikidata
View/Edit Human	View/Edit Mouse

Netrin receptor DCC, also known as DCC, or colorectal cancer suppressor is a protein which in humans is encoded by the DCC gene. DCC has long been implicated in colorectal cancer and its previous name was Deleted in colorectal carcinoma. Netrin receptor DCC is a single transmembrane receptor.

Since it was first discovered in a colorectal cancer study in 1990, DCC has been the focus of a significant amount of research. DCC held a controversial place as a tumour suppressor gene for many years, and is well known as an axon guidance receptor that responds to netrin-1.

More recently DCC has been characterized as a dependence receptor, and many hypotheses have been put forward that have revived interest in DCC's candidacy as a tumour suppressor gene, as it may be a ligand-dependent suppressor that is frequently epigenetically silenced.

== Background ==
Early studies of colorectal tumours found that allelic deletions of segments of chromosome 18q occur in a very high percentage of colorectal cancers. DCC was initially cloned out of the region and put forth as a putative tumour suppressor gene, though nothing was known about its function at the time. The DCC gene was examined for the genetic changes found with most other tumour suppressor genes, but it was found to have a comparatively low frequency of somatic mutation. Several years later DCC was shown to encode a transmembrane receptor protein that mediated the effects of netrin-1 on axon outgrowth.

Soon after the protein product was confirmed, DCC knockout mice were created. As DCC^{−/−} mutations are rapidly fatal due to a lack of nervous system development, DCC^{+/−} mice were assessed for increased tumour development over two years, and no increase in tumour predisposition was detected.

The discovery of a specific function for DCC that seemed to have little to do with cell cycle control, the low somatic mutation rate and the absence of cancer predisposition in DCC heterozygotes were fairly discouraging evidence for DCC's putative tumour suppressor status. This caused focus to shift to DCC's role in axon guidance for a time, until one study implicated DCC in regulation of cell death. As the 18q chromosomal deletions were never resolved to be related solely to another gene, DCC was rapidly reaccepted as a candidate. Recent research into the mechanisms of DCC signaling and in-vitro studies of DCC modifications have solidified DCC's tumour suppressor position, and have begun to integrate DCCs divergent functions as both an axon guidance molecule and a tumour suppressor into a single concept.

== Structure ==
The DCC gene is located at 18q21.3, and has a total of 57 possible exons and 43 possible introns. This theoretically results in 13 correctly sliced, putatively good proteins. The typical DCC protein has one signal peptide motif and eleven domains, including multiple immunoglobulin-like domains, a transmembrane domain, and several fibronectin type III domains.

DCC has extracellular binding sites for both netrin-1 and heparin. Heparin sulphate is believed to also be present during neural growth as a type of co-factor for axon guidance. Intracellularly, DCC has been shown to have a caspase-3 proteolysis site at Asp 1290.

DCC and neogenin, two of the netrin-1 receptors, have recently been shown to have sites for tyrosine phosphorylation (at Y1420 on DCC) and are likely interacting with Src family kinases in regulating responses to netrin-1.

== DCC as a dependence receptor ==
Historically, cellular receptors have been thought to be activated when bound to their ligand, and are relatively inactive when no ligand is present. A number of receptors have been found that do not fit into this conceptual mould, and DCC is one of them. These receptors are active both with ligand bound and unbound, but the signals transmitted are different when the receptors are ligand bound. Collectively, this type of receptor is known as a dependence receptor because the unbound pathway is usually apoptotic, meaning that cell survival depends on ligand presence. Other receptors also show this functional profile, including p75^{NTR}, the androgen receptor, RET, several integrins and Patched.

While not the first dependence receptor pair discovered, DCC and netrin-1 are an often quoted example of a dependence receptor system. When DCC is present on the membrane and bound to netrin-1, signals are conveyed that can lead to proliferation and cell migration. In the absence of netrin-1, DCC signaling has been shown to induce apoptosis. Only in the absence of DCC is there an absence of downstream signaling. There are therefore three possible signaling states for dependence receptors: on (ligand-bound, migration and proliferation), off (ligand-unbound, apoptosis inducing) and absent (lack of signal).

== Developmental and neurological roles ==
DCC's role in commissural axon outgrowth is perhaps its best characterized. In the developing spinal cord, commissural neurons located dorsally extend axons ventrally using a mechanism dependent on a ventral midline structure, the floor plate. A gradient of netrin-1 is produced from the floor plate, which allows orientation of the extending axons, aiding the development of the dorsal-ventral axis of the brain and spinal column. A variety of receptors are present on the axon surface which either repel or attract axons to the midline. When membrane DCC is stimulated by netrin-1, it promotes axon progression towards the midline.

There are several other molecules also involved in the guidance of axons to and across the midline. The slit proteins have repulsive functions, as opposed to netrins, and are mediated by the transmembrane protein Robo. Axonal growth cones that are attracted to the midline by netrin/DCC signaling eventually cross the floor plate. When this occurs they lose responsiveness to netrin and become repulsed by slit-Robo signaling. This is accomplished by the formation of a DCC-Robo complex, which inhibits attractive netrin/DCC signals while allowing slit-Robo signals. Netrin also has other receptors, the UNC-5 family. The UNC5 receptors have repellant migratory responses to netrin binding, and have similar effects to the slit-Robo system.

The intracellular signaling responses to netrin-1 are not yet well understood, even in neurobiology studies. Several phosphorylation events have been established, as have the involvement of several src family kinases and small GTPases, but the sequence of events has not yet been determined. DCC is also required to be recruited to lipid rafts for axon outgrowth and apoptotic signaling.

DCC is developmentally regulated, being present in most fetal tissues of the body at higher levels than what is found in adult tissues. DCC and netrin have been found to be specifically involved in the secondary migration of neural crest cells into the pancreas and developing gut structures, and may prove to be vital to other areas during fetal growth.

== Role in cancer ==
One of the most frequent genetic abnormalities that occur in advanced colorectal cancer is loss of heterozygosity (LOH) of DCC in region 18q21.

DCC in a receptor for netrin-1 and is currently believed by some to be a conditional tumour suppressor gene, meaning that it normally prevents cell growth when in the absence of netrin-1. DCC elimination is not believed to be a key genetic change in tumour formation, but one of many alterations that can promote existing tumour growth. DCC's possible role in migration of cancerous cells is in the process of being characterized.

While recent results make it fairly likely that DCC is involved in the biology of several cancers, the extent of its involvement and the details of how it works are still being studied.

=== Normal function in tumour suppression and apoptosis ===
When not bound to netrin-1, an intracellular domain of DCC is cleaved by a caspase, and induces apoptosis in a caspase-9-dependent pathway. This domain does not correspond to a known caspase recruitment motif or death sequence domain, but is required to initiate apoptosis. It has been theorized that the domain acts as a scaffold to recruit and activate caspase-9 and caspase-3. This DCC apoptosis pathway is not dependent on either the mitochondrial apoptosis pathway or the death receptor/caspase-8 pathway. In the absence of ligand, DCC interacts with caspase-9 (likely via an unidentified adaptor protein) and promotes the assembly of a caspase-activating complex. This causes the activation of caspase-3 through caspase-9, and initiates apoptosis without the formation of an apoptosome or cytochrome c release. This implies that DCC regulates a novel pathway for caspase activation, and that it is one that is apoptosome-independent.

To put this into a biological systems context, some physiology is required. In the gastrointestinal tract, epithelial cells proliferate and die rapidly. The division of these cells occurs at the base of villi, and cells are pushed upwards by subsequent divisions to the tip where they enter apoptosis and shed off into the lumen. Netrin-1 is produced in the base of the villi, so a gradient of netrin is present that is weakest at the tip. In normal physiology, the presence of netrin-1 inhibits DCC-mediated cell death until the epithelial cell reaches the tip of the villus, where the now unbound DCC causes the cell to enter apoptosis. In a cancer state, the absence of DCC prevents the gradient from having an effect on the cell, making it more likely to continue to survive.

DCC's role as a tumour suppressor is tied to its dependence receptor characteristics. DCC induces cell death on epithelial cells when no netrin-1 is bound. Besides from loss of heterozygosity of DCC, this mechanism of apoptosis can also be avoided in malignant processes by overexpression of netrin-1.

==== As an oncogene ====
DCC can be considered a conditional tumour suppressor gene as well as a conditional oncogene. When DCC is present and not activated by netrin it is proapoptotic, and represses tumour formation. When DCC is present and netrin-activated it promotes cell survival, acting as an oncoprotein. Netrin-activated DCC is known to activate the CDC42-RAC1 and MAPK1/3 pathways, both of which are activated in cancer and promote tumour development.

=== Mechanism of deletion ===
It was originally believed that there were two major pathways in colorectal cancer formation. The first was a chromosomal instability pathway thought to be responsible for the adenoma to carcinoma progression, which was characterized by loss of heterozygosity (LOH) on chromosome 5q, 17p and 18q. The second pathway was believed to be the microsatellite instability pathway, which is characterized by increases or decreases in the number of tandem repeats of simple DNA sequences. This type of instability is associated with some specific mutations, including genes involved with DNA mismatch repair and surprisingly, transforming growth factor-beta. More recently, those in the field of colorectal cancer have acknowledged that cancer formation is far more complex, but cancer related genes still tend to be categorized as chromosomal or microsatellite instability genes.

DCC would fall into the chromosomal instability category. The chromosomal region of 18q has shown consistent LOH for nearly twenty years. Approximately 70% of primary colorectal cancers display LOH in this region, and the percentage increases when comparing early to advanced cancers. This increase in DCC loss in advanced cancer may indicate that DCC loss is more important to tumour progression than tumour formation. However, region 18q is not the location of DCC alone, and many studies are in conflict when reporting whether 18q LOH is attributable to DCC or other tumour suppressor candidates in the neighbouring areas. Many reviews refuse to comment on DCC due to its history of conflicting information, stating that more study is required.

Chromosome 18 LOH tends to occur in clusters. One major cluster is at 18q21, which agrees with the location of DCC. This cluster includes the marker D18S51, and is flanked by the D18S1109 and D18S68 loci. This segment spans 7.64cM, which is a relatively large section of DNA that could easily encompass more than one tumour suppressor gene.

A significant difference between DCC expression and 18q21 LOH was detected in 1997. Studies found that more tumours had reduced DCC expression than could be explained by LOH or MSI, indicating that another mechanism was at work. This observation was likely explained when epigenetic analysis was performed.

=== Epigenetics ===
Loss of DCC in colorectal cancer primarily occurs via chromosomal instability, with only a small percent having epigenetic silencing involved.

Epigenetic silencing of DCC by promoter hypermethylation has shown to be a significant factor in other cancer types. In head and neck squamous cell carcinoma, 77.3% of tumour samples presented DCC promoter hypermethylation versus 0.8% in non-cancerous saliva samples. Similar results have been seen in breast cancer, acute lymphoblastic leukemia, and several others.

=== Use in pharmacogenetics ===
DCC has found to be a useful prognostic marker for late stage colorectal carcinoma in some studies, but unhelpful in others. Currently the American Society of Clinical Oncology does not recommend using DCC as a marker due to insufficient classification data.

A recent review of over two dozen 18q LOH-survival studies concluded that there was a significant amount of inconsistency between the data sets. They concluded that loss of 18q remains a marker for poor prognosis, and that DCC status has the potential to define a group of patients who may benefit from specific treatment regimes.

=== Metastasis ===
The increase in loss of heterozygosity percentages of chromosome 18q21 have long suggested that DCC may be involved in the progression of benign adenomas to malignant carcinomas. DCC has recently been found to suppress metastasis in an experimental environment, but a mechanism for this has not yet been proposed.

== Pharmacology ==
At this junction, DCC is not a pharmaceutical target. As DCC is not overexpressed in cancer and is present throughout the body, so it is not considered a good target for most types of cancer drugs.

DCC is expressed at very low levels through most of the body but at higher levels in many areas of the brain, particularly in dopamine neurons. Recently it has been shown that a sensitizing treatment regimen of amphetamines causes markedly increased levels of DCC and UNC-5 expression on neuron cell bodies. This may indicate that netrin-1 receptors are involved in the lasting effects of exposure to stimulant drugs like amphetamine, and may have some therapeutic value in the field of drug tolerance.

== Interactions ==
Deleted in Colorectal Cancer has been shown to interact with:

- APPL1,
- Androgen receptor,
- Caspase 3,
- MAZ,
- NTN1 and
- PTK2.

== History ==
DCC's biological role in cancer has had a long, controversial history. Although DCC has been studied for many years, a significant amount of the data collected is contradictory and much of the focus has been on getting clear picture of the basics.

When the genetic abnormalities that occur in advanced colorectal cancer were first identified, one of the most frequent events was found to be loss of heterozygosity (LOH) of region 18q21. One of the first genes sequenced in this region was DCC, and it was subsequently analyzed for tumour suppressor activity. However, the lack of somatic DCC mutations made it seem likely that the nearby SMAD2 and SMAD4 genes were the reason for 18q21 LOH. The fact that DCC heterozygotes had no increased rates of cancer, even when crossed with mice carrying Apc mutations, solidified this viewpoint. The finding that DCC was a receptor for netrin-1 involved in axon guidance initially moved research away from DCC in cancer. It was later realized that DCC may be involved in directing cell motility, which has direct implications for metastatic cancer.

The first direct evidence for DCC as a tumour suppressor gene was published in 1995. Researchers found that addition of DCC to an immortalized cell line suppressed tumorigenicity rather definitively. However no mechanism for this suppression was obvious, and it took several years to propose one.

Nearly ten years after DCC was discovered, studies were published that showed that DCC was involved in apoptosis. Instead of studying loss of DCC as was commonly done, the authors looked at human embryonic kidney cells transfected with DCC. They found an increase in apoptosis that corresponded to DCC expression, which was completely eliminated when netrin-1 was co-transfected or simply added to the media.

When it was understood that DCC apoptosis may also be overcome by netrin-1 overexpression, colorectal cancers were assessed for netrin-1 overexpression, and a small but significant percent of these cancers were found to vastly overexpress the molecule.
