= Growth cone =

Large actin extension of a developing neurite seeking its synaptic target

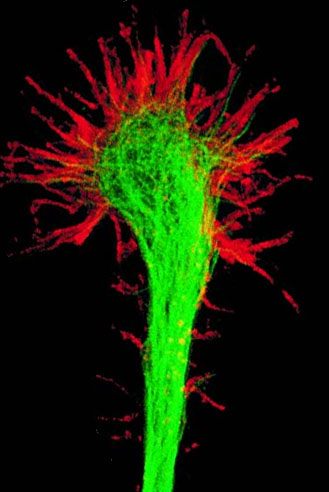
Image of a fluorescently-labeled growth cone extending from an axon F-actin (red) microtubules (green).

A growth cone is a large actin-supported extension of a developing or regenerating neurite seeking its synaptic target. It is the growth cone that drives axon growth. Their existence was originally proposed by Spanish histologist Santiago Ramón y Cajal based upon stationary images he observed under the microscope. He first described the growth cone based on fixed cells as "a concentration of protoplasm of conical form, endowed with amoeboid movements" (Cajal, 1890). Growth cones are situated on the tips of neurites, either dendrites or axons, of the nerve cell. The sensory, motor, integrative, and adaptive functions of growing axons and dendrites are all contained within this specialized structure.

== Structure ==
Two fluorescently-labeled growth cones. The growth cone (green) on the left is an example of a "filopodial" growth cone, while the one on the right is a "lamellipodial" growth cone. Typically, growth cones have both structures, but with varying sizes and numbers of each.

The morphology of the growth cone can be easily described by using the hand as an analogy. The fine extensions of the growth cone are pointed filopodia known as microspikes. The filopodia are like the "fingers" of the growth cone; they contain bundles of actin filaments (F-actin) that give them shape and support. Filopodia are the dominant structures in growth cones, and they appear as narrow cylindrical extensions which can extend several micrometres beyond the edge of the growth cone. The filopodia are bound by a membrane which contains receptors, and cell adhesion molecules that are important for axon growth and guidance.

In between filopodia—much like the webbing of the hands—are the lamellipodia. These are flat regions of dense actin meshwork instead of bundled F-actin as in filopodia. They often appear adjacent to the leading edge of the growth cone and are positioned between two filopodia, giving them a "veil-like" appearance. In growth cones, new filopodia usually emerge from these inter-filopodial veils.

The growth cone is described in terms of three regions: the peripheral (P) domain, the transitional (T) domain, and the central (C) domain. The peripheral domain is the thin region surrounding the outer edge of the growth cone. It is composed primarily of an actin-based cytoskeleton, and contains the lamellipodia and filopodia which are highly dynamic. Microtubules, however, are known to transiently enter the peripheral region via a process called dynamic instability. The central domain is located in the center of the growth cone nearest to the axon. This region is composed primarily of a microtubule-based cytoskeleton, is generally thicker, and contains many organelles and vesicles of various sizes. The transitional domain is the region located in the thin band between the central and peripheral domains.

Growth cones are molecularly specialized, with transcriptomes and proteomes that are distinct from those of their parent cell bodies. There are many cytoskeletal-associated proteins, which perform a variety of duties within the growth cone, such as anchoring actin and microtubules to each other, to the membrane, and to other cytoskeletal components. Some of these components include molecular motors that generate force within the growth cone and membrane-bound vesicles which are transported in and out of the growth cone via microtubules. Some examples of cytoskeletal-associated proteins are fascin and filamins (actin bundling), talin (actin anchoring), myosin (vesicle transport), and mDia (microtubule-actin linking).

== Axon branching and outgrowth ==
The highly dynamic nature of growth cones allows them to respond to the surrounding environment by rapidly changing direction and branching in response to various stimuli. There are three stages of axon outgrowth, which are termed: protrusion, engorgement, and consolidation. During protrusion, there is a rapid extension of filopodia and lamellar extensions along the leading edge of the growth cone. Engorgement follows when the filopodia move to the lateral edges of the growth cone, and microtubules invade further into the growth cone, bringing vesicles and organelles such as mitochondria and endoplasmic reticulum. Finally, consolidation occurs when the F-actin at the neck of the growth cone depolymerizes and the filopodia retract. The membrane then shrinks to form a cylindrical axon shaft around the bundle of microtubules. One form of axon branching also occurs via the same process, except that the growth cone "splits" during the engorgement phase. This results in the bifurcation of the main axon. An additional form of axon branching is termed collateral (or interstitial) branching;. Collateral branching, unlike axon bifurcations, involves the formation of a new branch from the established axon shaft and is independent of the growth cone at the tip of the growing axon. In this mechanism, the axon initially generates a filopodium or lamellipodium which following invasion by axonal microtubules can then develop further into a branch extending perpendicular from the axon shaft. Established collateral branches, like the main axon, exhibit a growth cone and develop independently of the main axon tip.

Overall, axon elongation is the product of a process known as tip growth. In this process, new material is added at the growth cone while the remainder of the axonal cytoskeleton remains stationary. This occurs via two processes: cytoskeletal-based dynamics and mechanical tension. With cytoskeletal dynamics, microtubules polymerize into the growth cone and deliver vital components. Mechanical tension occurs when the membrane is stretched due to force generation by molecular motors in the growth cone and strong adhesions to the substrate along the axon. In general, rapidly growing growth cones are small and have a large degree of stretching, while slow moving or paused growth cones are very large and have a low degree of stretching.

The growth cones are continually being built up through construction of the actin microfilaments and extension of the plasma membrane via vesicle fusion. The actin filaments depolymerize and disassemble on the proximal end to allow free monomers to migrate to the leading edge (distal end) of the actin filament where it can polymerize and thus reattach. Actin filaments are also constantly being transported away from the leading edge by a myosin-motor driven process known as retrograde F-actin flow. The actin filaments are polymerized in the peripheral region and then transported backward to the transitional region, where the filaments are depolymerized; thus freeing the monomers to repeat the cycle. This is different from actin treadmilling since the entire protein moves. If the protein were to simply treadmill, the monomers would depolymerize from one end and polymerize onto the other while the protein itself does not move.

The growth capacity of the axons lies in the microtubules which are located just beyond the actin filaments. Microtubules can rapidly polymerize into and thus "probe" the actin-rich peripheral region of the growth cone. When this happens, the polymerizing ends of microtubules come into contact with F-actin adhesion sites, where microtubule tip-associated proteins act as "ligands". Laminins of the basal membrane interact with the integrins of the growth cone to promote the forward movement of the growth cone. Additionally, axon outgrowth is also supported by the stabilization of the proximal ends of microtubules, which provide the structural support for the axon.

== Axon guidance ==
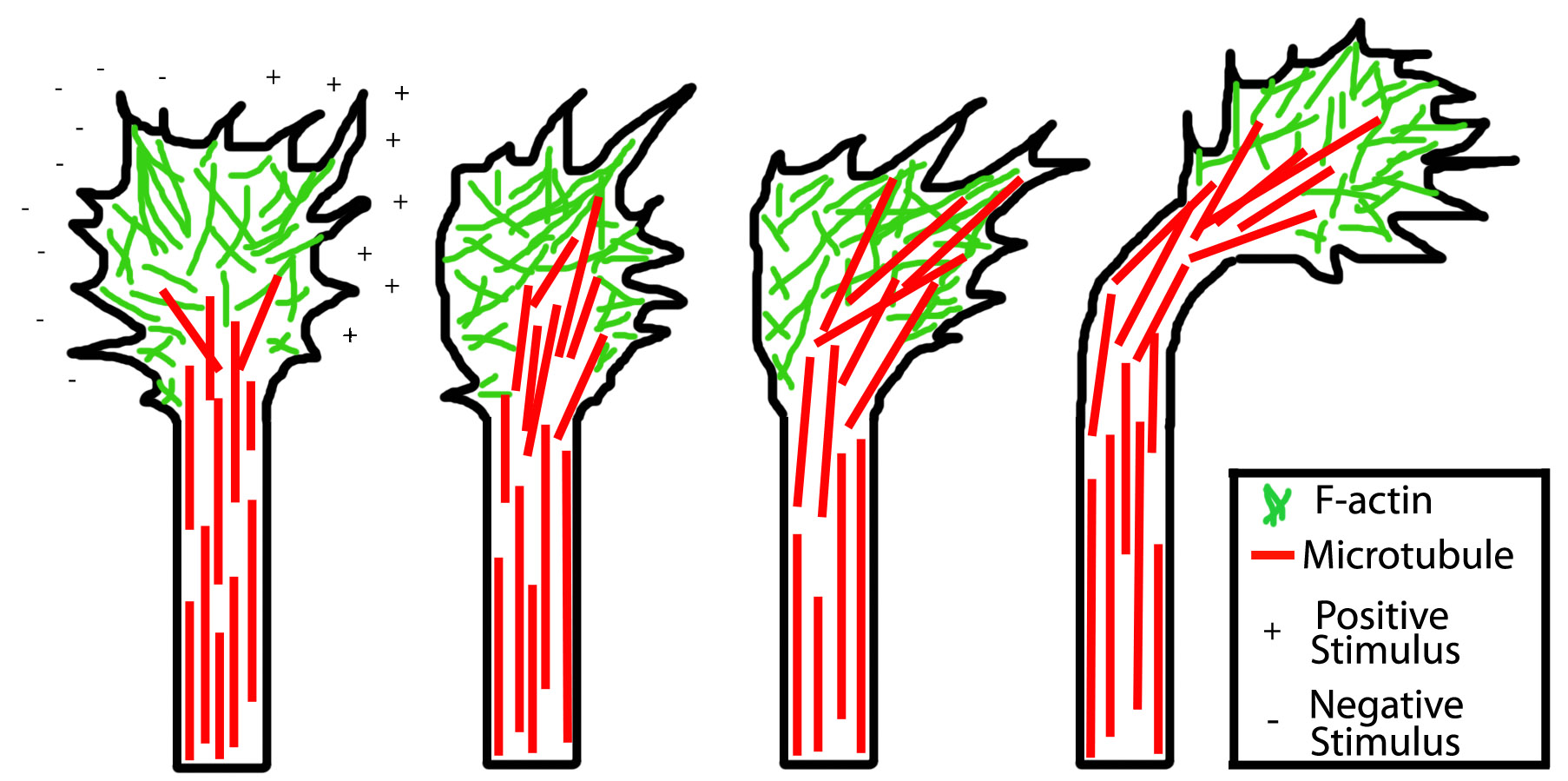
Model of growth cone-mediated axon guidance. From left to right, this model describes how the cytoskeleton responds and reorganizes to grow towards a positive stimulus (+) detected by receptors in the growth cone or away from a negative stimulus (-).

Movement of the axons is controlled by an integration of its sensory and motor function (described above) which is established through second messengers such as calcium and cyclic nucleotides. The sensory function of axons is dependent on cues from the extracellular matrix which can be either attractive or repulsive, thus helping to guide the axon away from certain paths and attracting them to their proper target destinations. Attractive cues inhibit retrograde flow of the actin filaments and promote their assembly whereas repulsive cues have the exact opposite effect. Actin stabilizing proteins are also involved and are essential for continued protrusion of filopodia and lamellipodia in the presence of attractive cues, while actin destabilizing proteins are involved in the presence of a repulsive cue.

A similar process is involved with microtubules. In the presence of an attractive cue on one side of the growth cone, specific microtubules are targeted on that side by microtubule stabilizing proteins, resulting in growth cone turning in the direction of the positive stimulus. With repulsive cues, the opposite is true: microtubule stabilization is favored on the opposite side of the growth cone as the negative stimulus resulting in the growth cone turning away from the repellent. This process coupled with actin-associated processes result in the overall directed growth of an axon.

Growth cone receptors detect the presence of axon guidance molecules such as Netrin, Slit, Ephrins, and Semaphorins. It has more recently been shown that cell fate determinants such as Wnt or Shh can also act as guidance cues. The same guidance cue can act as an attractant or a repellent, depending on context. A prime example of this is Netrin-1, which signals attraction through the Netrin receptor DCC and repulsion through the UNC-5 receptor. Furthermore, it has been discovered that these same molecules are involved in guiding vessel growth. Axon guidance directs the initial wiring of the nervous system and is also important in axonal regeneration following an injury.
