= Timeline of human brain development =

When the human brain ceases to make new neurons and stops developing in humans

The human brain development timeline encompasses the sequential, overlapping phases in which the central nervous system forms, matures, and reorganizes from conception through adolescence and into early adulthood. This process starts in the third gestational week with the differentiation of neural progenitor cells and progresses through neurogenesis, cell migration, synaptogenesis, myelination, and synaptic pruning.

Many foundational structures of the brain, including the forebrain, midbrain, and hindbrain, emerge by the sixth week of gestation, with further differentiation resulting in secondary regions like the telencephalon, diencephalon, and metencephalon in subsequent weeks. Structural milestones, including the formation of cortical folds and the appearance of commissural fibers, occur rapidly during prenatal development.

Postnatally, white matter volume and grey matter architecture undergo significant changes, with cortical regions maturing at different rates. The frontal and parietal lobes tend to mature earlier than temporal regions, with synaptic pruning and myelination continuing into the fourth decade of life. Experience and environmental factors dynamically shape neural connectivity, influencing lifelong cognitive, affective, and behavioral outcomes.

Advances in magnetic resonance imaging and the study of brain organoids have enhanced understanding of neurological disorders and critical periods of vulnerability, enabling new approaches for early diagnosis and intervention.

== Conception ==
Highlights of human brain development from conception through adulthood.

| Day | Event | Reference |
|---|---|---|
| 33 | posterior commissure appears | Ashwell et al. (1996) |
| 33 | medial forebrain bundle appears | Ashwell et al. (1996) |
| 44 | mammillothalamic tract appears | Ashwell et al. (1996) |
| 44 | stria medullaris thalami appears | Ashwell et al. (1996) |
| 51 | axons in optic stalk | Dunlop et al. (1997) |
| 56 | external capsule appears | Ashwell et al. (1996) |
| 56 | stria terminalis appears | Ashwell et al. (1996) |
| 60 | optic axons invade visual centers | Dunlop et al. (1997) |
| 63 | internal capsule appears | Ashwell et al. (1996) |
| 63 | fornix appears | Ashwell et al. (1996) |
| 70 | anterior commissure appears | Ashwell et al. (1996) |
| 77 | hippocampal commissure appears | Ashwell et al. (1996) |
| 87.5 | corpus callosum appears | Ashwell et al. (1996) |
| 157.5 | eye opening | Clancy et al. (2007) |
| 175 | ipsi/contra segregation in LGN and SC | Robinson & Dreher (1990) |

Studies report that three primary structures are formed in the sixth gestational week. These are the forebrain, the midbrain, and the hindbrain, also known as the prosencephalon, mesencephalon, and the rhombencephalon respectively. Five secondary structures originate from these in the seventh gestational week. These are the telencephalon, diencephalon, mesencephalon, metencephalon, and myelencephalon; the lateral ventricles, third ventricles, cerebral aqueduct, and upper and lower parts of the fourth ventricle in adulthood originated from these structures. The appearance of cortical folds first takes place during 24 and 32 weeks of gestation.

== Childhood and adolescence ==
Cortical white matter increases from childhood (~9 years) to adolescence (~14 years), most notably in the frontal and parietal cortices. Cortical grey matter development peaks at ~12 years of age in the frontal and parietal cortices, and 14–16 years in the temporal lobes (with the superior temporal cortex being last to mature), peaking at about roughly the same age in both sexes according to reliable data. In terms of grey matter loss, the sensory and motor regions mature first, followed by other cortical regions. Though it is a controversial psychometric, adult IQ also begins to be tested around this age range, with the Raven's Progressive Matrices test beginning at age 14 and the Wechsler Adult Intelligence Scale test beginning at age 16, though scores between 14 and 16 on the Wechsler test have differences so small that they are considered unreliable. This may bring into question the effectiveness of brain development studies in treating and successfully rehabilitating criminal youth.

In the 2010s and beyond, science has shown that the brain continues to develop until at least 30 years of age.

== See also ==
- Brain development timelines
- Development of the nervous system in humans
- Evolution of the brain
