= Axon guidance =

Neuroscience field

Axon guidance (also called axon pathfinding) is a subfield of neural development concerning the process by which neurons send out axons to reach their correct targets. Axons often follow very precise paths in the nervous system, and how they manage to find their way so accurately is an area of ongoing research.

Axon growth takes place from a region called the growth cone and reaching the axon target is accomplished with relatively few guidance molecules. Growth cone receptors respond to the guidance cues.

== Mechanisms ==
Growing axons have a highly motile structure at the growing tip called the growth cone, which responds to signals in the extracellular environment that instruct the axon in which direction to grow. These signals, called guidance cues, can be fixed in place or diffusible; they can attract or repel axons. Growth cones contain receptors that recognize these guidance cues and interpret the signal into a chemotropic response. The general theoretical framework is that when a growth cone "senses" a guidance cue, the receptors activate various signaling molecules in the growth cone that eventually affect the cytoskeleton. If the growth cone senses a gradient of guidance cue, the intracellular signaling in the growth cone happens asymmetrically, so that cytoskeletal changes happen asymmetrically and the growth cone turns toward or away from the guidance cue.

A combination of genetic and biochemical methods (see below) has led to the discovery of several important classes of axon guidance molecules and their receptors:

- Netrins: Netrins are secreted molecules that can act to attract or repel axons by binding to their receptors, DCC and UNC-5.
- Slits: Secreted proteins that normally repel growth cones by engaging Robo (Roundabout) class receptors in Slit-Robo cell signaling complexes.
- Ephrins: Ephrins are cell surface molecules that activate Eph receptors on the surface of other cells. This interaction can be attractive or repulsive. In some cases, Ephrins can also act as receptors by transducing a signal into the expressing cell, while Ephs act as the ligands. Signaling into both the Ephrin- and Eph-bearing cells is called "bi-directional signaling."
- Semaphorins: The many types of semaphorins are primarily axonal repellents, and activate complexes of cell-surface receptors called plexins and neuropilins.
- Cell adhesion molecules (CAMs): Integral membrane proteins mediating adhesion between growing axons and eliciting intracellular signalling within the growth cone. CAMs are the major class of proteins mediating correct axonal navigation of axons growing on axons (fasciculation). There are two CAM subgroups: IgSF-CAMs (belonging to the immunoglobulin superfamily) and cadherins (Ca-dependent CAMs).

In addition, many other classes of extracellular molecules are used by growth cones to navigate properly:

- Developmental morphogens, such as BMPs, Wnts, Hedgehog, and FGFs
- Extracellular matrix and adhesion molecules such as laminin, tenascins, proteoglycans, N-CAM, and L1
- Growth factors like NGF
- Neurotransmitters and modulators like GABA

=== Integration of information in axon guidance ===
Growing axons rely on a variety of guidance cues in deciding upon a growth pathway. The growth cones of extending axons process these cues in an intricate system of signal interpretation and integration, in order to ensure appropriate guidance. These cues can be functionally subdivided into:

- Adhesive cues, that provide physical interaction with the substrate necessary for axon protrusion. These cues can be expressed on glial and neuronal cells the growing axon contacts or be part of the extracellular matrix. Examples are laminin or fibronectin, in the extracellular matrix, and cadherins or Ig-family cell-adhesion molecules, found on cell surfaces.
- Tropic cues, that can act as attractants or repellents and cause changes in growth cone motility by acting on the cytoskeleton through intracellular signaling. For example, Netrin plays a role in guiding axons through the midline, acting as both an attractant and a repellent, while Semaphorin3A helps axons grow from the olfactory epithelium to map different locations in the olfactory bulb.
- Modulatory cues, that influence the sensitivity of growth cones to certain guidance cues. For instance, neurotrophins can make axons less sensitive to the repellent action of Semaphorin3A.

Given the abundance of these different guidance cues it was previously believed that growth cones integrate various information by simply summing the gradient of cues, in different valences, at a given point in time, to making a decision on the direction of growth. However, studies in vertebrate nervous systems of ventral midline crossing axons, has shown that modulatory cues play a crucial part in tuning axon responses to other cues, suggesting that the process of axon guidance is nonlinear. For example, commissural axons are attracted by Netrin and repelled by Slit. However, as axons approach the midline, the repellent action of Slit is suppressed by Robo-3/Rig-1 receptor. Once the axons cross the midline, activation of Robo by Slit silences Netrin-mediated attraction, and the axons are repelled by Slit.

=== Cellular strategies of nerve tract formation ===
==== Pioneer axons ====
The formation of a nerve tract follows several basic rules. In both invertebrate and vertebrate nervous systems initial nerve tracts are formed by the pioneer axons of pioneer neurons. These axons follow a reproducible pathway, stop at intermediate targets, and branch axons at certain choice points, in the process of targeting their final destination. This principle is illustrated by CNS extending axons of sensory neurons in insects.

During the process of limb development, proximal neurons are the first to form axonal bundles while growing towards the CNS. In later stages of limb growth, axons from more distal neurons fasciculate with these pioneer axons. Deletion of pioneer neurons disrupts the extension of later axons, destined to innervate the CNS. At the same time, it is worth noting that in most cases pioneer neurons do not contain unique characteristics and their role in axon guidance can be substituted by other neurons. For instance, in Xenopus retinotectal connection systems, the pioneer axons of retinal ganglion cells originate from the dorsal part of the eye. However, if the dorsal half of the eye is replaced by less mature dorsal part, ventral neurons can replace the pioneer pathway of the dorsal cells, after some delay. Studies in zebrafish retina showed that inhibiting neural differentiation of early retinal progenitors prevents axons from exiting the eye. The same study demonstrated aberrant growth trajectories in secondary neurons, following the growth of pioneer neurons missing a guidance receptor. Thus, while the extent of guidance provided by pioneer axons is under debate and may vary from system to system, the pioneer pathways clearly provide the follower projections with guidance cues and enhance their ability to navigate to target.

==== Role of glia ====
The first extending axons in a pathway interact closely with immature glia cells. In the forming corpus callosum of vertebrates, primitive glia cells first migrate to the ependymal zones of hemispheres and the dorsal septum wall to form a transient structure that the pioneer axons of the callosal fibers use to extend. The signaling between glia and neurons in the developing nervous system is reciprocal. For instance, in the fly visual system, axons of photoreceptors require glia to exit the eye stalk whereas glia cells rely on signals from neurons to migrate back along axons.

==== Guideposts ====
The growing axons also rely on transient neuronal structures such as guidepost cells, during pathfinding. In the mouse visual system, proper optic chiasm formation depends on a V-shaped structure of transient neurons that intersect with specialized radial glia at the midline of the chiasm. The chiasm axons grow along and around this structure but do not invade it. Another example is the subplate in the developing cerebral cortex that consists of transient neuronal layer under the subventricular zone and serves as a guidepost for axons entering permanent cortical layers. The subplate is similar to the chiasmatic neurons in that these cell groups disappear (or transit into other cell types) as the brain matures. These findings indicate that transitory cell populations can serve an important guidance role even though they have no function in the mature nervous system.

== Studying axon guidance ==
The earliest descriptions of the axonal growth cone were made by the Spanish neurobiologist Santiago Ramón y Cajal in the late 19th century. However, understanding the molecular and cellular biology of axon guidance would not begin until decades later. In the last thirty years or so, scientists have used various methods to work out how axons find their way. Much of the early work in axon guidance was done in the grasshopper, where individual motor neurons were identified and their pathways characterized. In genetic model organisms like mice, zebrafish, nematodes, and fruit flies, scientists can generate mutations and see whether and how they cause axons to make errors in navigation. In vitro experiments can be useful for direct manipulation of growing axons. A popular method is to grow neurons in culture and expose growth cones to purified guidance cues to see whether these cause the growing axons to turn. These types of experiments have often been done using traditional embryological non-genetic model organisms, such as the chicken and African clawed frog. Embryos of these species are easy to obtain and, unlike mammals, develop externally and are easily accessible to experimental manipulation.

=== Axon guidance model systems ===
Several types of axon pathways have been extensively studied in model systems to further understand the mechanisms of axon guidance. Perhaps the two most prominent of these are commissures and topographic maps. Commissures are sites where axons cross the midline from one side of the nervous system to the other. Topographic maps are systems in which groups of neurons in one tissue project their axons to another tissue in an organized arrangement such that spatial relationships are maintained; i.e. adjacent neurons will innervate adjacent regions of the target tissue.

==== Commissure formation: attraction and repulsion ====
As described above, axonal guidance cues are often categorized as "attractive" or "repulsive." This is a simplification, as different axons will respond to a given cue differently. Furthermore, the same axonal growth cone can alter its responses to a given cue based on timing, previous experience with the same or other cues, and the context in which the cue is found. These issues are exemplified during the development of commissures. The bilateral symmetry of the nervous system means that axons will encounter the same cues on either side of the midline. Before crossing (ipsilaterally), the growth cone must navigate toward and be attracted to the midline. However, after crossing (contralaterally), the same growth cone must become repelled or lose attraction to the midline and reinterpret the environment to locate the correct target tissue.

Two experimental systems have had particularly strong impacts on understanding how midline axon guidance is regulated:

===== The ventral nerve cord of Drosophila =====
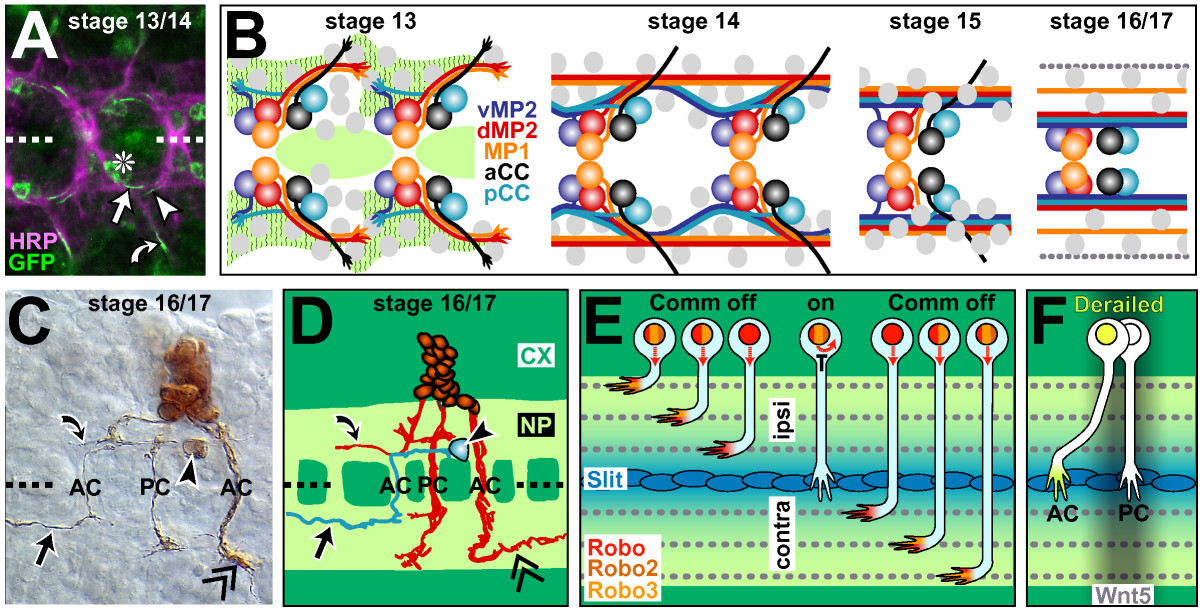
Axon guidance in the Drosophila embryonic ventral nerve cord. From Sanchez-Soriano et al., 2007

The use of powerful genetic tools in Drosophila led to the identification of a key class of axon guidance cues, the Slits, and their receptors, the Robos (short for Roundabout). The ventral nerve cord looks like a ladder, with three longitudinal axon bundles (fascicles) connected by the commissures, the "rungs" of the ladder. There are two commissures, anterior and posterior, within each segment of the embryo.

The currently accepted model is that Slit, produced by midline cells, repels axons from the midline via Robo receptors. Ipsilaterally projecting (non-crossing) axons always have Robo receptors on their surface, while commissural axons have very little or no Robo on their surface, allowing them to be attracted to the midline by Netrins and, probably, other as-yet unidentified cues. After crossing, however, Robo receptors are strongly upregulated on the axon, which allows Robo-mediated repulsion to overcome attraction to the midline. This dynamic regulation of Robo is at least in part accomplished by a molecule called Comm (short for Commissureless), which prevents Robo from reaching the cell surface and targeting it for destruction.

===== The spinal cord of mice and chickens =====
In the spinal cord of vertebrates, commissural neurons from the dorsal regions project downward toward the ventral floor plate. Ipsilateral axons turn before reaching the floor plate to grow longitudinally, while commissural axons cross the midline and make their longitudinal turn on the contralateral side. Strikingly, Netrins, Slits, and Robos all play similar functional roles in this system as well. One outstanding mystery was the apparent lack of any comm gene in vertebrates. It now seems that at least some of Comm's functions are performed by a modified form of Robo called Robo3 (or Rig1).

The spinal cord system was the first to demonstrate explicitly the altered responsiveness of growth cones to cues after exposure to the midline. Explanted neurons grown in culture would respond to exogenously supplied Slit according to whether or not they had contacted floor plate tissue.

==== Topographic maps: gradients for guidance ====
As described above, topographic maps occur when spatial relationships are maintained between neuronal populations and their target fields in another tissue. This is a major feature of nervous system organization, particular in sensory systems. The neurobiologist Roger Sperry proposed a prescient model for topographic mapping mediated by what he called molecular "tags." The relative amounts of these tags would vary in gradients across both tissues. We now think of these tags as ligands (cues) and their axonal receptors. Perhaps the best understood class of tags are the Ephrin ligands and their receptors, the Ephs.

In the simplest type of mapping model, we could imagine a gradient of Eph receptor expression level in a field of neurons, such as the retina, with the anterior cells expressing very low levels and cells in the posterior expressing the highest levels of the receptor. Meanwhile, in the target of the retinal cells (the optic tectum), Ephrin ligands are organized in a similar gradient: high posterior to low anterior. Retinal axons enter the anterior tectum and proceed posteriorly. Because, in general, Eph-bearing axons are repelled by Ephrins, axons will become more and more reluctant to proceed the further they advance toward the posterior tectum. However, the degree to which they are repelled is set by their own particular level of Eph expression, which is set by the position of the neuronal cell body in the retina. Thus, axons from the anterior retina, expressing the lowest level of Ephs, can project to the posterior tectum, even though this is where Ephrins are highly expressed. Posterior retinal cells express high Eph level, and their axons will stop more anteriorly in the tectum.

===== The retinotectal projection of chickens, frogs and fish =====
The large size and accessibility of the chicken embryo has made it a favorite model organism for embryologists. Researchers used the chick to biochemically purify components from the tectum that showed specific activity against retinal axons in culture. This led to the identification of Ephs and Ephrins as Sperry's hypothesized "tags."

The retinotectal projection has also been studied in Xenopus and zebrafish. Zebrafish is a potentially powerful system because genetic screens like those performed in invertebrates can be done relatively simply and cheaply. In 1996, large scale screens were conducted in zebrafish, including screens for retinal axon guidance and mapping. Many of the mutants have yet to be characterized.

=== Cell biology ===
Genetics and biochemistry have identified a large set of molecules that affect axon guidance. How all of these pieces fit together is less understood. Most axon guidance receptors activate signal transduction cascades that ultimately lead to reorganization of the cytoskeleton and adhesive properties of the growth cone, which together underlie the motility of all cells. This has been well documented in mammalian cortical neurons. However, this raises the question of how the same cues can result in a spectrum of response from different growth cones. It may be that different receptors activate attraction or repulsion in response to a single cue. Another possibility is the receptor complexes act as "coincidence detectors" to modify responses to one cue in the presence of another. Similar signaling "cross-talk" could occur intracellularly, downstream of receptors on the cell surface.

In fact, commissural axon growth responses have been shown to be attracted, repressed, or silenced in the presence of netrin activated DCC receptor. This variable activity is dependent on Robo or UNC-5 receptor expression at growth cones. Such that Slit activated Robo receptor, causes a silencing of Netrin's attractive potential through the DCC receptor. While growth cones expressing UNC-5 receptor, respond in a repulsive manner to Netrin-DCC activation. These events occur as consequence of cytoplasmic interactions between the Netrin activated DCC receptor and Robo or UNC-5 receptor, which ultimately alters DCC's cytoplasmic signaling. Thus, the picture that emerges is that growth cone advancement is highly complex and subject to plasticity from guidance cues, receptor expression, receptor interactions, and the subsequent signaling mechanisms that influence cytoskeleton remodeling.

==== Growth cone translation in guided axons ====
The ability for axons to navigate and adjust responses to various extracellular cues, at long distances from the cell body, has prompted investigators to look at the intrinsic properties of growth cones. Recent studies reveal that guidance cues can influence spatiotemporal changes in axons by modulating the local translation and degradation of proteins in growth cones. Furthermore, this activity seems to occur independent of distal nuclear gene expression. In fact, in retinal ganglion cells (RGCs) with soma severed axons, growth cones continue to track and innervate the tectum of Xenopus embryos.

To accommodate this activity, growth cones are believed to pool mRNAs that code for receptors and intracellular signaling proteins involved in cytoskeleton remodeling. In Xenopus retinotectal projection systems, the expression of these proteins has been shown to be influenced by guidance cues and the subsequent activation of local translation machinery. The attractive cue Netrin-1, stimulates mRNA transport and influence synthesis of β-Actin in filopodia of growth cones, to restructure and steer RGC growth cones in the direction of Netrin secretion. While the repulsive cue, Slit, is suggested to stimulate the translation of Cofilin (an actin depolymerizing factor) in growth cones, leading to axon repulsion. In addition, severed commissural axons in chicks, display the capability of translating and expressing Eph-A2 receptor during midline crossing. As a result, studies suggest that local protein expression is a convenient mechanism to explain the rapid, dynamic, and autonomous nature of growth cone advancement in response to guidance molecules.

==== The axon growth hypothesis and the consensus connectome dynamics ====
Contemporary diffusion-weighted MRI techniques may also uncover the macroscopical process of axonal development. The connectome, or the braingraph, can be constructed from diffusion MRI data: the vertices of the graph correspond to anatomically labelled brain areas, and two such vertices, say u and v, are connected by an edge if the tractography phase of the data processing finds an axonal fiber that connects the two areas, corresponding to u and v. Numerous braingraphs, computed from the Human Connectome Project can be downloaded from the http://braingraph.org site. The Consensus Connectome Dynamics (CCD) is a remarkable phenomenon that was discovered by continuously decreasing the minimum confidence-parameter at the graphical interface of the Budapest Reference Connectome Server. The Budapest Reference Connectome Server depicts the cerebral connections of n=418 subjects with a frequency-parameter k: For any k=1,2,...,n one can view the graph of the edges that are present in at least k connectomes. If parameter k is decreased one-by-one from k=n through k=1 then more and more edges appear in the graph, since the inclusion condition is relaxed. The surprising observation is that the appearance of the edges is far from random: it resembles a growing, complex structure, like a tree or a shrub (visualized on this animation on YouTube. It is hypothesized in that the growing structure copies the axonal development of the human brain: the earliest developing connections (axonal fibers) are common in most of the subjects, and the subsequently developing connections have larger and larger variance, because their variances are accumulated in the process of axonal development.

== Genetic association ==
Axon guidance is genetically associated with other characteristics or features. For example, enrichment analyses of different signaling pathways led to the discovery of a genetic association with intracranial volume.

== See also ==
- RTN4R mediates inhibition of axonal growth
