= Accessory cuneate nucleus =

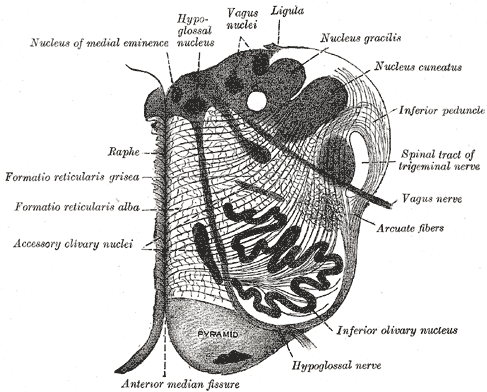
- Section of the medulla oblongata at about the middle of the olive. (Accessory cuneate nucleus is not labeled, but cuneate nucleus is labeled at upper right, and the accessory cuneate nucleus would be found lateral to it.)

Details
- Part of: Medulla oblongata

Identifiers
- Latin: nucleus cuneatus accessorius
- NeuroNames: 768
- NeuroLex ID: birnlex_2634
- TA98: A14.1.04.209
- TA2: 6000
- FMA: 72603

The accessory cuneate nucleus (also lateral cuneate nucleus, or external cuneate nucleus) is a nucleus situated in the caudal medulla oblongata just lateral to the cuneate nucleus. It relays unconscious proprioceptive sensory information from the upper limb and upper trunk to the cerebellum via the cuneocerebellar fibers.

The neurons of the ACN (as well as those of the lateral portion of the cuneate nucleus) are functionally homologous with the posterior thoracic nucleus; the cuneocerebellar fibers are therefore the upper body functional equivalent of the dorsal spinocerebellar tract.

== Anatomy ==
Synapses in the ACN are somatotopically organized.

=== Afferents ===
Afferents of the ACN arise from muscle stretch receptors and skin touch receptors of the upper limb; they enter the spinal cord rostral to the posterior thoracic nucleus to ascend in the lateral portion of the cuneate fasciculus. A minority of the fibers of the cuneate fasciculus thus synapse in the ACN.

=== Efferents ===
Efferents of the ACN form the cuneocerebellar fibers that pass through the ipsilateral restiform body of the inferior cerebellar peduncle to terminate in the ipsilateral hemisphere of the cerebellum; a few of its efferents do not join the cuneocerebellar fibers, instead ascending in the contralateral medial lemniscus to terminate in the thalamus.

== Additional images ==
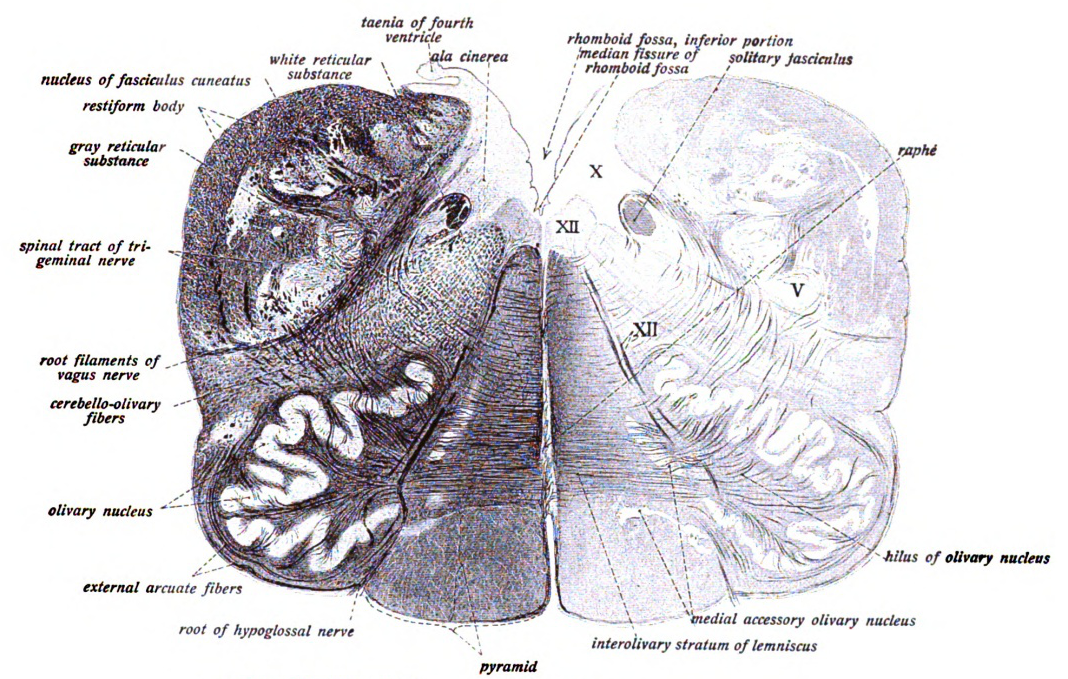
