= Sulcus of spinal cord =

Sulcus of spinal cord may refer to:

- Anterolateral sulcus of spinal cord
- Posterolateral sulcus of spinal cord
- Posterior median sulcus of spinal cord
