= Arcuate fibers =

Arcuate fibers can refer to:

- Internal arcuate fibers
- Anterior external arcuate fibers
- Posterior external arcuate fibers
