= Jacob Lockhart Clarke =

British physiologist and neurologist

Jacob Augustus Lockhart Clarke (1817 – 25 January 1880) was a British physiologist and neurologist who is primarily known for his studies of the brain and the spinal cord.

== Life ==
As his father died early, young Clarke was brought up by his mother in France. Upon moving to England, he chose the medical profession, to which his elder brother and grandfather belonged, and studied at Guy’s Hospital, and St Thomas' Hospital. Having obtained the diploma of the Worshipful Society of Apothecaries, he began practice at Pimlico, living with his mother. He became devoted to microscopical research on the brain and nervous system, and applying a new method, and proceeding with extreme care and thoroughness, he established many new facts of structure which had important bearings on the physiology and pathology of the nervous system. His first paper, "Researches into the Structure of the Spinal Cord", was received by the Royal Society on 15 October 1850, and published in their Transactions for 1851. It was illustrated, like many of his subsequent papers, by extremely accurate and valuable drawings by himself, and these have been subsequently reproduced in numerous works.

He received the Royal Medal of the Royal Society in 1861, and in 1867 he was elected an honorary follow of the King and Queen’s College of Physicians, Ireland. Late in life, he attended St. George’s Hospital and qualified as a surgeon, still later obtained the M.D. St. Andrews (1869), and became a member of the London College of Physicians (1871), and entered upon consulting practice in nervous diseases. He became physician to the Hospital for Epilepsy and Paralysis, but gained no great amount of practice, probably owing to his retired habits, and his having published no book by which the public could judge of his work. He died on 25 January 1880 from phthisis.

== Work ==
Clarke was the first to establish the location of the dorsal nucleus of the spinal cord, calling it "posterior vesicular columns", and described the nucleus intermediolateralis. He also differentiated the medial cuneate nucleus from the lateral cuneate nucleus (also called "Monakow's nucleus" after neuropathologist Constantin von Monakow). Clarke is credited with introducing the histological technique of mounting cleared sections of tissue in balsam media.

He published numerous essays on the anatomy and physiology of the medulla oblongata and spinal cord. He also had works published involving studies of tetanus, diabetes, paraplegia and muscular atrophy. The eponymous Clarke's nucleus (also known as the column of Clarke or as the "nucleus dorsalis of Clarke") is a name sometimes given for the dorsal nucleus of the spinal cord.
