= External arcuate fibers =

External arcuate fibers may refer to:

- Anterior external arcuate fibers
- Posterior external arcuate fibers
