= General somatic fibers =

General somatic fibers may refer to:

- General somatic afferent fibers
- General somatic efferent fibers
