= Sensory decussation =

Crossing of axons between the gracile and cuneate nuclei of the brain

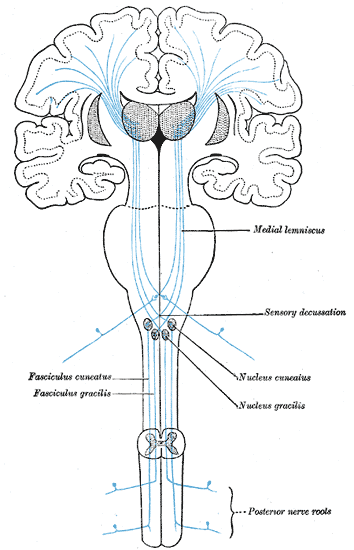
- The sensory tract

Details

Identifiers
- Latin: decussatio lemnisci medialis
- NeuroNames: 788

The sensory decussation or decussation of the lemnisci is a decussation (a crossing over) of axons from the gracile nucleus and cuneate nucleus, known together as the dorsal column nuclei. The dorsal column nuclei are responsible for fine touch, vibration, proprioception and two-point discrimination.

The fibers of this decussation are called the internal arcuate fibers and are found at the superior aspect of the closed medulla oblongata, superior to the motor decussation. Neurons of these nuclei are second-order neurons in the dorsal column–medial lemniscus pathway.

== Structure ==
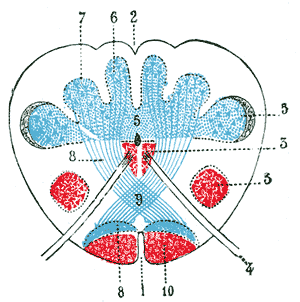
The figure shows the cross section of the closed medulla at the level of the sensory decussation. Number 9 illustrates the sensory decussation at the posterior column.

At the level of the closed medulla in the posterior white column, two large nuclei namely the gracile nucleus and the cuneate nucleus can be found. The two nuclei receive the impulse from the two ascending tracts: fasciculus gracilis and fasciculus cuneatus. After the two tracts terminate upon these nuclei, the heavily myelinated fibres arise and ascend anteromedially around the periaqueductal gray as internal arcuate fibres. These fibres decussate (cross) to the contralateral (opposite) side, so called the sensory decussation. The ascending bundle after the decussation is called the medial lemniscus. Unlike other ascending tracts of the brain, fibres of the medial lemniscus do not give off collateral branches as they travel along the brainstem.

== Function ==
The fibres that make up the sensory decussation are responsible for fine nice touch, proprioception and two-point discrimination of the whole body excluding the head.

== Additional images ==
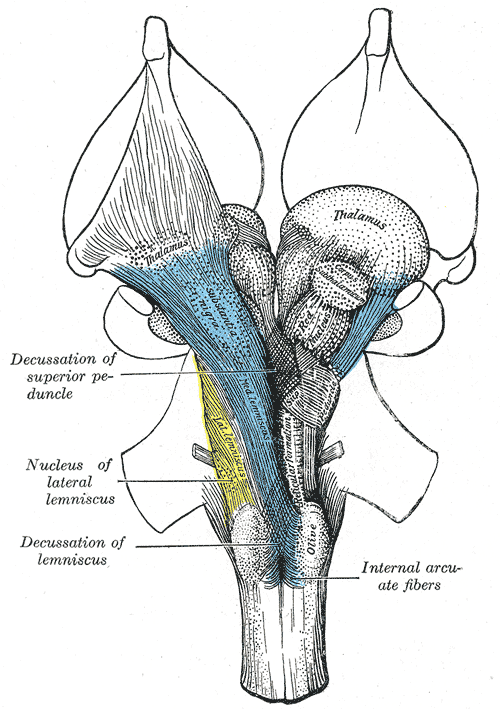
Deep dissection of brain-stem. Ventral view.

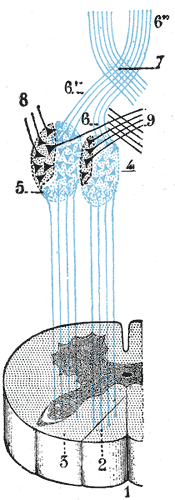
Superior terminations of the posterior fasciculi of the medulla spinalis.
