= Special senses =

Senses with specialized organs

In medicine and anatomy, the special senses are the senses that have specialized organs devoted to them:

- vision (the eye)
- hearing and balance (the ear, which includes the auditory system and vestibular system)
- smell (the nose)
- taste (the tongue)

The distinction between special and general senses is used to classify nerve fibers running to and from the central nervous system – information from special senses is carried in special somatic afferents and special visceral afferents. In contrast, the other sense, touch, is a somatic sense which does not have a specialized organ but comes from all over the body, most noticeably the skin but also the internal organs (viscera). Touch includes mechanoreception (pressure, vibration and proprioception), pain (nociception) and heat (thermoception), and such information is carried in general somatic afferents and general visceral afferents.

== Vision ==
Visual perception is the ability to interpret the surrounding environment using light in the visible spectrum reflected by the objects in the environment. The resulting perception is also known as visual perception, eyesight, sight, or vision (adjectival form: visual, optical, or ocular). The various physiological components involved in vision are referred to collectively as the visual system.

The visual system in animals allows individuals to assimilate information from their surroundings. The act of seeing starts when the cornea and then the lens of the eye focuses light from its surroundings onto a light-sensitive membrane in the back of the eye, called the retina. The retina is actually part of the brain that is isolated to serve as a transducer for the conversion of light into neuronal signals. Based on feedback from the visual system, the lens of the eye adjusts its thickness to focus light on the photoreceptive cells of the retina, also known as the rods and cones, which detect the photons of light and respond by producing neural impulses. These signals are processed via complex feedforward and feedback processes by different parts of the brain, from the retina upstream to central ganglia in the brain.

Note that up until now much of the above paragraph could apply to octopuses, mollusks, worms, insects and things more primitive; anything with a more concentrated nervous system and better eyes than say a jellyfish. However, the following applies to mammals generally and birds (in modified form): The retina in these more complex animals sends fibers (the optic nerve) to the lateral geniculate nucleus, to the primary and secondary visual cortex of the brain. Signals from the retina can also travel directly from the retina to the superior colliculus.

The perception of objects and the totality of the visual scene is accomplished by the visual association cortex, which combines all sensory information perceived by the striate cortex which contains thousands of modules that are part of modular neural networks. The neurons in the striate cortex send axons to the extrastriate cortex, a region in the visual association cortex that surrounds the striate cortex.

The human visual system perceives visible light in the range of wavelengths between 370 and 730 nanometers (0.00000037 to 0.00000073 meters) of the electromagnetic spectrum.

== Hearing ==
Hearing, or auditory perception, is the ability to perceive sound by detecting vibrations, changes in the pressure of the surrounding medium through time, through an organ such as the ear. Sound may be heard through solid, liquid, or gaseous matter. It is one of the traditional five senses; partial or total inability to hear is called hearing loss.

In humans and other vertebrates, hearing is performed primarily by the auditory system: mechanical waves, known as vibrations, are detected by the ear and transduced into nerve impulses that are perceived by the brain (primarily in the temporal lobe). Like touch, audition requires sensitivity to the movement of molecules in the world outside the organism. Both hearing and touch are types of mechanosensation.

There are three main components of the human ear: the outer ear, the middle ear, and the inner ear.

== Smell ==
Smell, or olfaction, is a chemoreception that forms the sense of smell. Olfaction has many purposes, such as the detection of hazards, pheromones, and food. It integrates with other senses to form the sense of flavor. Olfaction occurs when odorants bind to specific sites on olfactory receptors located in the nasal cavity. Glomeruli aggregate signals from these receptors and transmit them to the olfactory bulb, where the sensory input will start to interact with parts of the brain responsible for smell identification, memory, and emotion. Often, land organisms will have separate olfaction systems for smell and taste (orthonasal smell and retronasal smell), but water-dwelling organisms usually have only one system.

In vertebrates, smells are sensed by olfactory sensory neurons in the olfactory epithelium. The olfactory epithelium is made up of at least six morphologically and biochemically different cell types. The proportion of olfactory epithelium compared to respiratory epithelium (not innervated, or supplied with nerves) gives an indication of the animal's olfactory sensitivity. Humans have about 10 cm^{2} (1.6 sq in) of olfactory epithelium, whereas some dogs have 170 cm^{2} (26 sq in). A dog's olfactory epithelium is also considerably more densely innervated, with a hundred times more receptors per square centimeter.

Molecules of odorants passing through the superior nasal concha of the nasal passages dissolve in the mucus that lines the superior portion of the cavity and are detected by olfactory receptors on the dendrites of the olfactory sensory neurons. This may occur by diffusion or by the binding of the odorant to odorant-binding proteins. The mucus overlying the epithelium contains mucopolysaccharides, salts, enzymes, and antibodies (these are highly important, as the olfactory neurons provide a direct passage for infection to pass to the brain). This mucus acts as a solvent for odor molecules, flows constantly, and is replaced approximately every ten minutes.

== Taste ==
Taste is the sensation produced when a substance in the mouth reacts chemically with taste receptor cells located on taste buds in the oral cavity, mostly on the tongue. Taste, along with smell (olfaction) and trigeminal nerve stimulation (registering texture, pain, and temperature), determines flavors of food or other substances. Humans have taste receptors on taste buds (gustatory calyculi) and other areas including the upper surface of the tongue and the epiglottis. The gustatory cortex is responsible for the perception of taste.

The tongue is covered with thousands of small bumps called papillae, which are visible to the naked eye. Within each papilla are hundreds of taste buds. The exception to this is the filiform papillae that do not contain taste buds. There are between 2000 and 5000 taste buds that are located on the back and front of the tongue. Others are located on the roof, sides and back of the mouth, and in the throat. Each taste bud contains 50 to 100 taste receptor cells.

The sensation of taste includes five established basic tastes: sweetness, sourness, saltiness, bitterness, and umami. Scientific experiments have proven that these five tastes exist and are distinct from one another. Taste buds are able to differentiate among different tastes through detecting interaction with different molecules or ions. Sweet, umami, and bitter tastes are triggered by the binding of molecules to G protein-coupled receptors on the cell membranes of taste buds. Saltiness and sourness are perceived when alkali metal or hydrogen ions enter taste buds, respectively.

The basic tastes contribute only partially to the sensation and flavor of food in the mouth—other factors include smell, detected by the olfactory epithelium of the nose; texture, detected through a variety of mechanoreceptors, muscle nerves, etc.; temperature, detected by thermoreceptors; and "coolness" (such as of menthol) and "hotness" (pungency), through chemesthesis.

As taste senses both harmful and beneficial things, all basic tastes are classified as either aversive or appetitive, depending upon the effect the things they sense have on our bodies. Sweetness helps to identify energy-rich foods, while bitterness serves as a warning sign of poisons.

Among humans, taste perception begins to fade around 50 years of age because of loss of tongue papillae and a general decrease in saliva production. Humans can also have distortion of tastes through dysgeusia. Not all mammals share the same taste senses: some rodents can taste starch (which humans cannot), cats cannot taste sweetness but can taste ATP, and several other carnivores including hyenas, dolphins, and sea lions, have lost the ability to sense up to four of their ancestral five taste senses.
