= Median fissure =

Median fissure may refer to:

- Anterior median fissure of the spinal cord
- Anterior median fissure of the medulla oblongata
- Posterior median sulcus of medulla oblongata, also known as posterior median fissure
