= General afferent fibers =

General afferent fibers may refer to:

- General somatic afferent fiber
- General visceral afferent fibers
