= Median sulcus =

Median sulcus can refer to:

- median sulcus of the tongue
- median sulcus of floor of fourth ventricle
- posterior median sulcus of spinal cord
- posterior median sulcus of medulla oblongata
