= Internal arcuate fibers =

Axons of neurons that compose the brain's gracile and cuneate nuclei

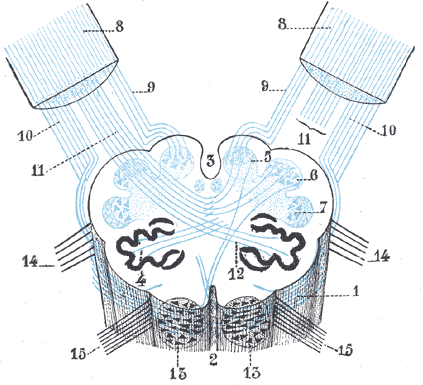
- Diagram showing the course of the arcuate fibers. (Testut) 1. Medulla oblongata anterior surface. 2. Anterior median fissure. 3. Fourth ventricle. 4. Inferior olivary nucleus, with the accessory olivary nuclei. 5. Gracile nucleus. 6. Cuneate nucleus. 7. Trigeminal. 8. Inferior peduncles, seen from in front. 9. Posterior external arcuate fibers. 10. Anterior external arcuate fibers. 11. Internal arcuate fibers. 12. Peduncle of inferior olivary nucleus. 13. Arcuate nucleus (medulla). 14. Vagus. 15. Hypoglossal.

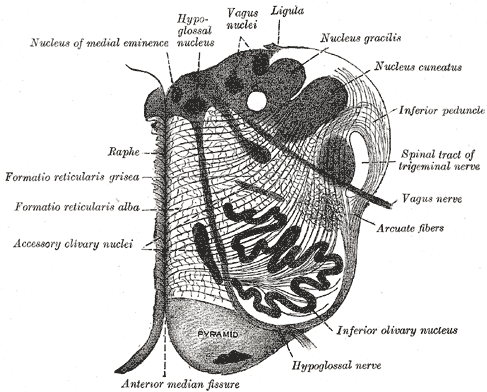
- Section of the medulla oblongata at about the middle of the olive. (Arcuate fibers labeled at center right.)

Details

Identifiers
- Latin: fibrae arcuatae internae
- NeuroNames: 795
- NeuroLex ID: birnlex_1091
- TA98: A14.1.04.109
- TA2: 6042
- FMA: 72629

In neuroanatomy, the internal arcuate fibers or internal arcuate tract are the axons of second-order sensory neurons that compose the gracile and cuneate nuclei of the medulla oblongata. These second-order neurons begin in the gracile and cuneate nuclei in the medulla. They receive input from first-order sensory neurons, which provide sensation to many areas of the body and have cell bodies in the dorsal root ganglia of the dorsal root of the spinal nerves. Upon decussation (crossing over) from one side of the medulla to the other, also known as the sensory decussation, they are then called the medial lemniscus.

The internal arcuate fibers are part of the second-order neurons of the posterior column-medial lemniscus system, and are important for relaying the sensation of fine touch and proprioception to the thalamus and ultimately to the cerebral cortex.
