= Posterolateral sulcus =

Posterolateral sulcus can refer to:

- Posterolateral sulcus of medulla oblongata
- Posterolateral sulcus of spinal cord
