= Anterolateral sulcus =

Anterolateral sulcus may refer to:

- Anterolateral sulcus of medulla
- Anterolateral sulcus of spinal cord
