= Anterior funiculus =

Details

Identifiers
- Latin: funiculus anterior medullae spinalis
- TA98: A14.1.02.202
- TA2: 6110
- FMA: 74003

In the spinal cord, the most lateral of the bundles of the ventral nerve roots is generally taken as a dividing line that separates the antero-lateral region into two parts: an anterior funiculus (or anterior column), between the anterior median fissure and the most lateral of the ventral nerve roots; and a lateral funiculus, between the exit of these roots and the posterolateral sulcus.

== See also ==
- Funiculus (neuroanatomy)
- Lateral funiculus
- Posterior funiculus
