= Anterolateral =

Anterolateral may refer to:

- Anterolateral central arteries
- Anterolateral ligament
- Anterolateral ganglionic branches
- Anterolateral sulcus of medulla
- Anterolateral sulcus of spinal cord
- Anterolateral system
