= General visceral fibers =

General visceral fibers may refer to:

- General visceral afferent fibers
- General visceral efferent fibers
