= Posterior median sulcus =

Posterior median sulcus can refer to:

- Posterior median sulcus of spinal cord
- Posterior median sulcus of medulla oblongata
