= General efferent fibers =

General efferent fibers may refer to:

- General somatic efferent fibers
- General visceral efferent fibers
