= Sulcus limitans (neural tube) =

A shallow, longitudinal groove separating the developing gray matter into a basal and alar plates along the length of the neural tube. The sulcus limitans extends the length of the spinal cord and through the mesencephalon.
