= Anterior external arcuate fibers =

Identifiers
- NeuroLex ID: birnlex_1628

Anterior external arcuate fibers
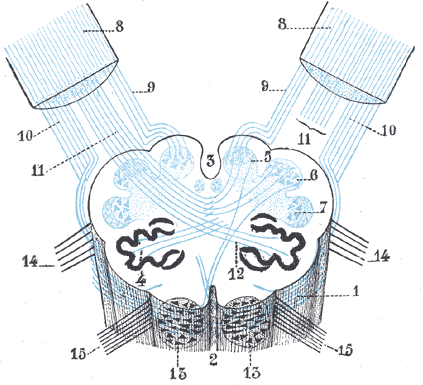
- Diagram showing the course of the arcuate fibers. (Testut.) 1. Medulla oblongata anterior surface. 2. Anterior median fissure. 3. Fourth ventricle. 4. Inferior olivary nucleus, with the accessory olivary nuclei. 5. Gracile nucleus. 6. Cuneate nucleus. 7. Trigeminal. 8. Inferior peduncles, seen from in front. 9. Posterior external arcuate fibers. 10. Anterior external arcuate fibers. 11. Internal arcuate fibers. 12. Peduncle of inferior olivary nucleus. 13. Nucleus arcuatus. 14. Vagus. 15. Hypoglossal.

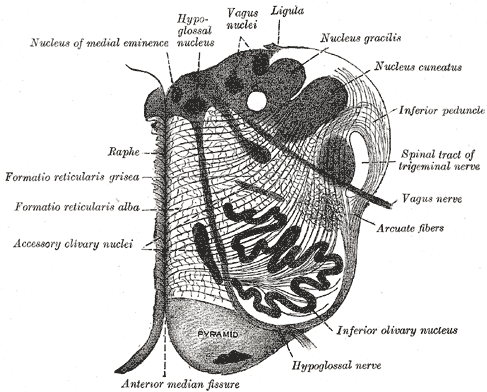
- Section of the medulla oblongata at about the middle of the olive. (Arcuate fibers labeled at center right.)

Details

Identifiers
- Latin: fibrae arcuatae externae anteriores
- NeuroLex ID: birnlex_1628

The anterior external arcuate fibers (ventral external arcuate fibers) vary as to their prominence: in some cases they form an almost continuous layer covering the medullary pyramids and olivary body, while in other cases they are barely visible on the surface.

They arise from the cells of the gracile and cuneate nuclei, and pass forward through the reticular formation to decussate (cross over to the other side) in the middle line.

Most of them reach the surface by way of the anterior median fissure, and arch backward over the pyramid, the olive, and the lateral district of the medulla oblongata to enter the cerebellum through the inferior peduncle. The fibers are reinforced in their course by fibers emerging between the pyramid and olive.

As the fibers arch across the pyramid, they enclose a small nucleus which lies in front of and medial to the pyramid.

This is named the arcuate nucleus, and is serially continuous above with the pontine nuclei in the pons; it contains small fusiform (spindle-shaped) cells, around which some of the arcuate fibers end, and from which others arise.

== Additional images ==
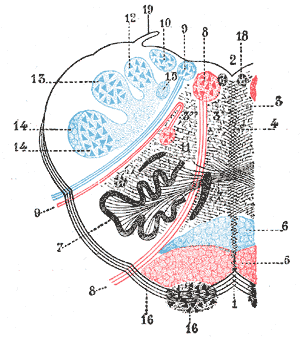
The reticular formation shown by a transverse section passing through the middle of the olive.
