= Trigeminal tubercle =

The trigeminal tubercle or tuberculum cinereum is a raised area upon (the caudal/inferior portion of) the lateral dorsal/posterior aspect of the medulla oblongata produced by the underlying spinal tract of the trigeminal nerve (cranial nerve V). It is situated just lateral to the tuberculum cuneatus (of nucleus cuneatus), between the rootlets of the accessory nerve and posterolateral sulcus.
