= Friedrich Goll =

Swiss neuroanatomist

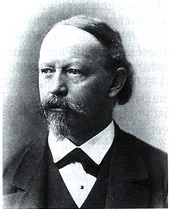
Friedrich Goll.

Friedrich Goll (1 March 1829 – 12 November 1903) was a Swiss neuroanatomist born in Zofingen, a town located in the canton of Aargau.

In 1853 he received his medical doctorate from the University of Zurich, and furthered his education in Paris, where he studied under physiologist Claude Bernard (1813–1878). Afterwards he returned to Zurich, where from 1855, he worked as a general practitioner of medicine. In 1862 he became habilitated for special pathology and pharmacology at the University of Zurich, where from 1863 to 1869, he was director of the medical polyclinic. From 1885 to 1901 he served as an associate professor of pharmacology in Zurich.

He was an avid mountaineer and promoter of spas and resorts in Graubünden. From 1885 to 1895, he served as president of the Medical Society of the Canton of Zurich.

Goll is remembered for his description of the fasciculus gracilis, a bundle of axon fibers in the spinal cord that is also known as the "tract of Goll" in honor of his discovery.

== Selected writings ==
- Über den Einfluss des Blutdruckes auf die Harnabsonderung, (dissertation, 1853) - On the influence of blood pressure on urinary secretion.
- Beiträge zur feineren Anatomie des menschlichen Rückenmarks, 1860 - Contributions to the finer anatomy of the human spinal cord.
