= Lateral funiculus =

Details

Identifiers
- Latin: funiculus lateralis medullae spinalis
- TA98: A14.1.02.215; A14.1.04.007
- TA2: 6093
- FMA: 74000

The most lateral of the bundles of the anterior nerve roots is generally taken as a dividing line that separates the anterolateral system into two parts. These are the anterior funiculus, between the anterior median fissure and the most lateral of the anterior nerve roots, and the lateral funiculus between the exit of these roots and the posterolateral sulcus.

The lateral funiculus transmits the contralateral corticospinal and spinothalamic tracts. A lateral cutting of the spinal cord results in the transection of both ipsilateral posterior column and lateral funiculus and this produces Brown-Séquard syndrome.

== See also ==
- Funiculus (neuroanatomy)
- Anterior funiculus
- Posterior funiculus
