= General sense (anatomy) =

In medicine and anatomy, the general senses are the senses which are perceived due to receptors scattered throughout the body such as touch, temperature, and hunger, rather than tied to a specific structure, as the special senses vision or hearing are. Often, the general senses are associated with a specific drive; that is, the sensation will cause a change in behavior meant to reduce the sensation.
