= Olivary body =

Organ in the medulla part of human brain

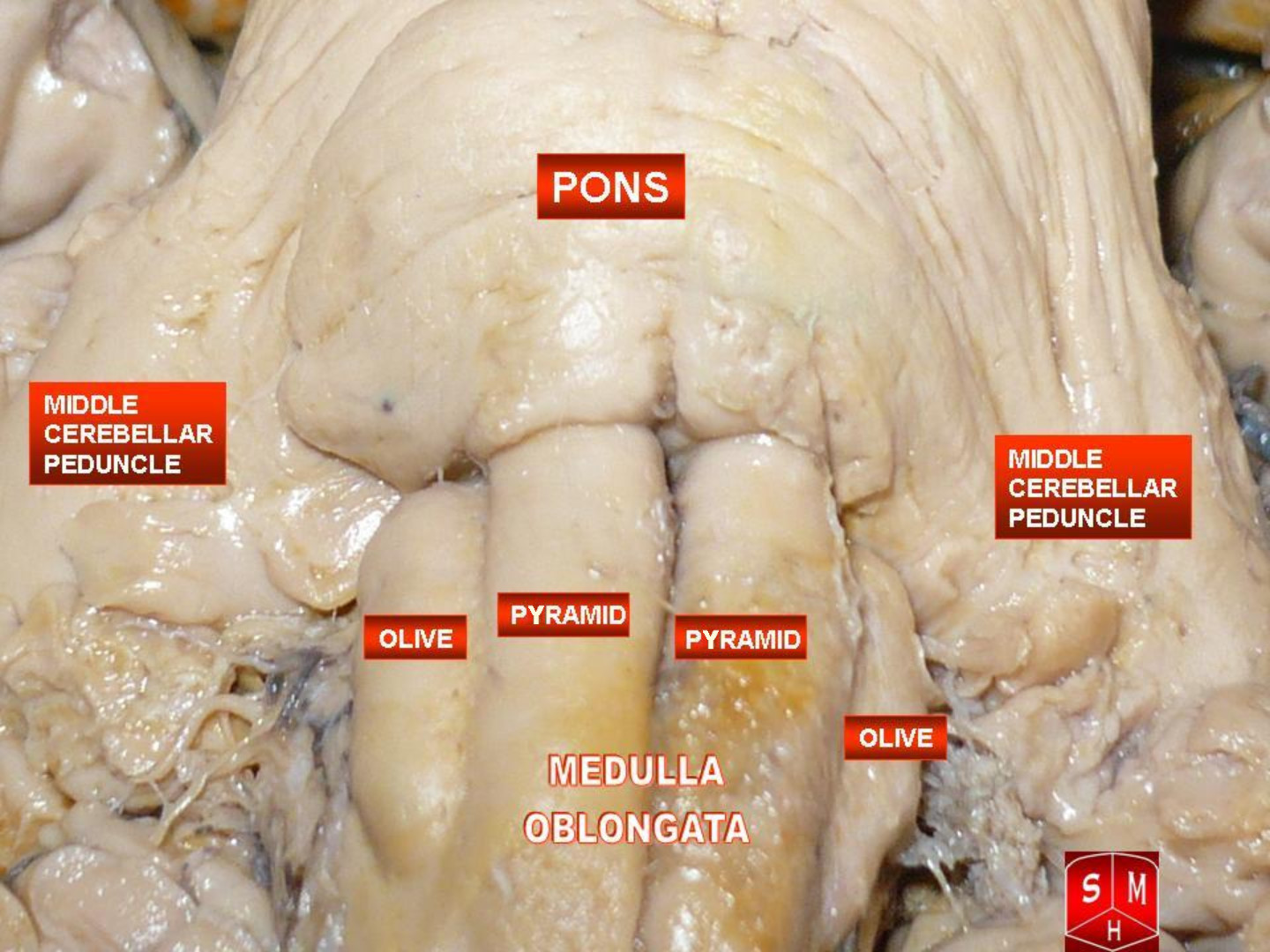
- The medulla, showing the olives lying adjacent to the pyramids.

- Animation shows the location of the olives in green.

Details
- Part of: Medulla

Identifiers
- Latin: oliva
- MeSH: D009847

The olivary bodies or simply olives (Latin oliva and olivae, singular and plural, respectively) are a pair of prominent oval structures on either side of the medullary pyramids in the medulla, the lower portion of the brainstem. They contain the olivary nuclei.

== Structure ==
Each olivary body is located on the anterior surface of the medulla lateral to the pyramid, from which it is separated by the antero-lateral sulcus and the fibers of the hypoglossal nerve.

Behind (dorsally), it is separated from the postero-lateral sulcus by the ventral spinocerebellar fasciculus. In the depression between the upper end of the olive and the pons lies the vestibulocochlear nerve.

In humans, it measures about 1.25 cm in length, and between its upper end and the pons there is a slight depression to which the roots of the facial nerve are attached.

The external arcuate fibers wind across the lower part of the pyramid and olive and enter the inferior peduncle.

=== Olivary nuclei ===
The olive consists of two parts:

- The inferior olivary nucleus (or 'complex'), which is a part of the olivo-cerebellar system and is mainly involved in cerebellar motor-learning and function.
- The superior olivary nucleus, considered part of the pons and part of the auditory system, aiding the perception of sound.

The inferior olive in itself is divided to 3 main nuclei:

- The primary olivary nucleus (PO) which consist of the major laminar structure.
- The medial accessory olivary nucleus (MAO) lies between the primary olivary nucleus and the pyramid, and forms a curved lamina, the concavity of which is directed laterally.
- The dorsal accessory olivary nucleus (DAO) is the smallest, and appears on transverse section as a curved lamina behind the primary olivary nucleus.

Small additional inferior olivary structures consist of the dorsal cap of Kooy and the ventrolateral outgrowth.

== Additional images ==
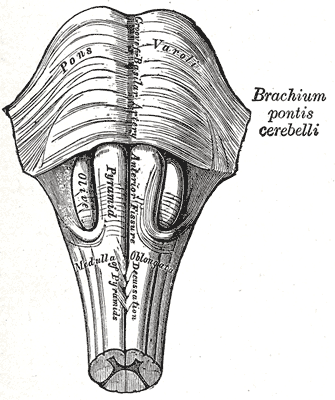
The medulla, showing the olivary bodies lying adjacent to the pyramids.

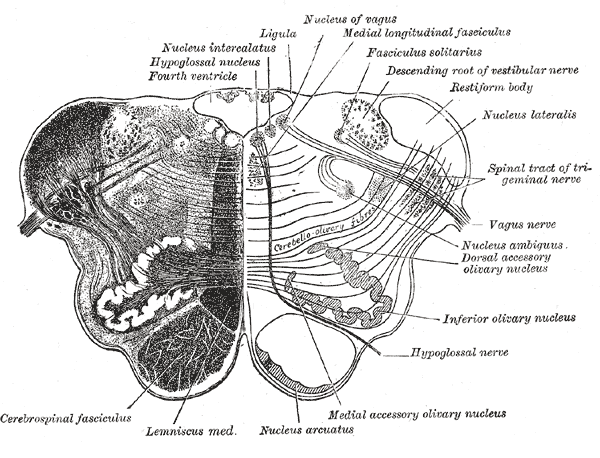
Transverse section of medulla oblongata below the middle of the olive.

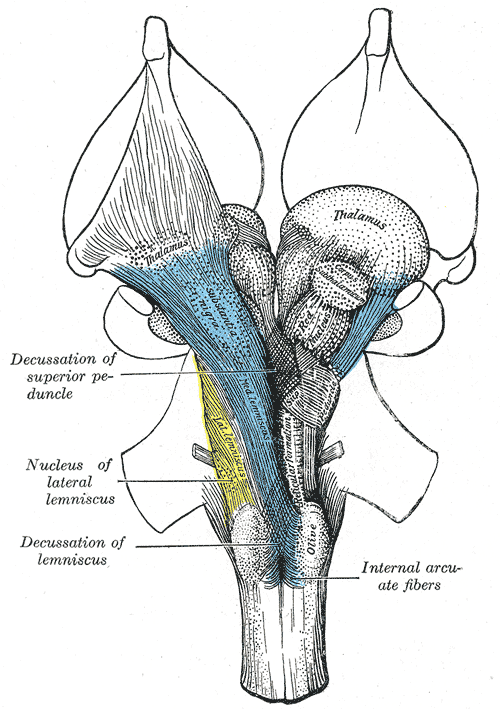
Deep dissection of brain-stem. Ventral view.

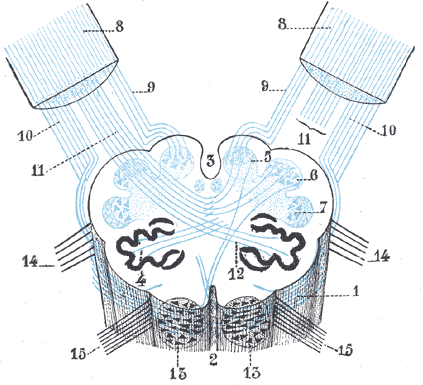
Diagram showing the course of the arcuate fibers.

Basal view of a human brain
