= Alar plate =

Anatomical structure of the developing nervous system

- Diagram to illustrate the alar and basal laminæ of brain vesicles.

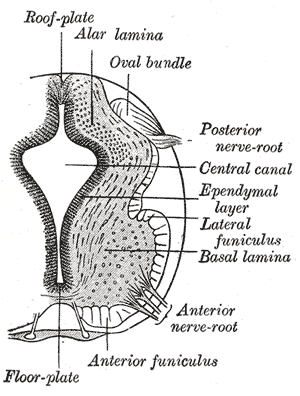
- aged about four and a half weeks.

Details
- Carnegie stage: 13
- Precursor: Neural tube
- Gives rise to: Dorsal gray of the spinal cord, and develops into the sensory nuclei of cranial nerves V, VII, VIII, IX, and X. The inferior olivary nucleus, mesencephalic nucleus of V, and main sensory nucleus of V

Identifiers
- Latin: lamina dorsolateralis, lamina alaris
- TE: plate_by_E5.14.1.0.1.0.4 E5.14.1.0.1.0.4

The alar plate (or alar lamina) is a neural structure in the embryonic nervous system, part of the dorsal side of the neural tube, that involves the communication of general somatic and general visceral sensory impulses. The caudal part later becomes the sensory axon part of the spinal cord.

The alar plate specifically later on becomes the dorsal gray of the spinal cord, and also develops into the sensory nuclei of cranial nerves V, VII, VIII, IX, and X. The inferior olivary nucleus, mesencephalic nucleus of V, and main sensory nucleus of V are also developed from this plate. The cerebellum also develops from the alar plate, particularly from the rhombic lip. This is considered an exception to the general differentiation scheme from the alar plate, as the alar plate generally gives rise to sensory derivatives.

== See also ==
- Basal plate
