= Posterior thoracic nucleus =

Neuron cluster in the spinal cord

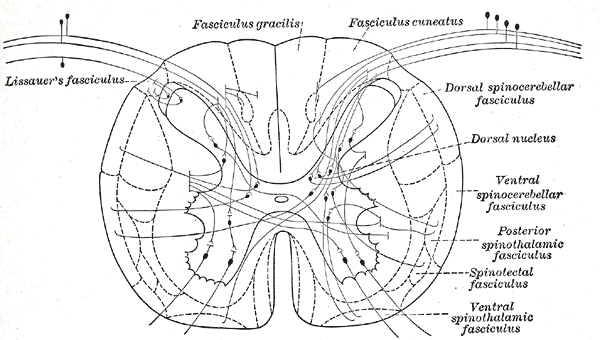
- Diagram showing a few of the connections of afferent (sensory) fibers of the posterior root with the efferent fibers from the ventral column and with the various long ascending fasciculi. (Dorsal nucleus labeled at center right.)

- Schematic of spinal cord grey matter showing location of the dorsal nucleus

Details

Identifiers
- Latin: nucleus thoracicus posterior, nucleus dorsalis
- TA98: A14.1.02.135
- TA2: 6074
- FMA: 73912

The posterior thoracic nucleus, (Clarke's column, column of Clarke, dorsal nucleus, nucleus dorsalis of Clarke) is a group of interneurons found in the medial part of Rexed lamina VII, also known as the intermediate zone, of the spinal cord. It is located from the cervical segment C8 to lumbar segment L3 of the spinal cord and is an important structure for proprioception of the lower limb.

== Anatomy ==
It occupies the medial part of the base of the posterior grey column and appears on the transverse section as a well-defined oval area.

It begins caudally at the level of the second or third lumbar nerve, and reaches its maximum size opposite the twelfth thoracic nerve. Above the level of the eight thoracic nerve its size diminishes, and the column ends opposite the last cervical or first thoracic nerve.

It is represented, however, in the other regions by scattered cells, which become aggregated to form a cervical nucleus opposite the third cervical nerve, and a sacral nucleus in the middle and lower part of the sacral region.

Nerve cells in the posterior thoracic nucleus are most abundant between the lower thoracic and upper lumbar segments. Cell bodies are of medium size and oval- or pyriform-shape. These cells characteristically present coarse Nissl granules and have characteristic eccentric nuclei.

Axonal projections from neurons in this nucleus give rise to the dorsal spinocerebellar tract which ascends ipsilaterally through the spinal cord and ends as mossy fibers in the ipsilateral cerebellar cortex after passing through the inferior cerebellar peduncle. Axons originating from the posterior thoracic nucleus which ascend contralaterally through the lateral funiculus of the spinal cord are named ventral spinocerebellar tract which cross over again within the white matter of the cerebellum, to ultimately end on its ipsilateral side.

== Function ==
The posterior thoracic nucleus is a major relay center for unconscious proprioception. Sensory information from muscle spindles and tendon organs is carried by axons of larger neurons in dorsal root ganglia, which synapse onto neurons in the spinal cord including the posterior thoracic nucleus. From here information continues rostrally until it reaches the cerebellar cortex. This relay pathway is generally known as the dorsal spinocerebellar tract.

== Diseases ==
It has been observed that in Friedreich's ataxia there is evident degeneration of the posterior thoracic nucleus as well as other proprioceptive spinal tracts. These patients might present with ataxia, dysarthria, muscle weakness or paralysis and skeletal defects.

== Eponym ==
Clarke's column is named for Jacob Augustus Lockhart Clarke.
