= Two-point discrimination =

Ability to discern between single and pairs of points on one's skin

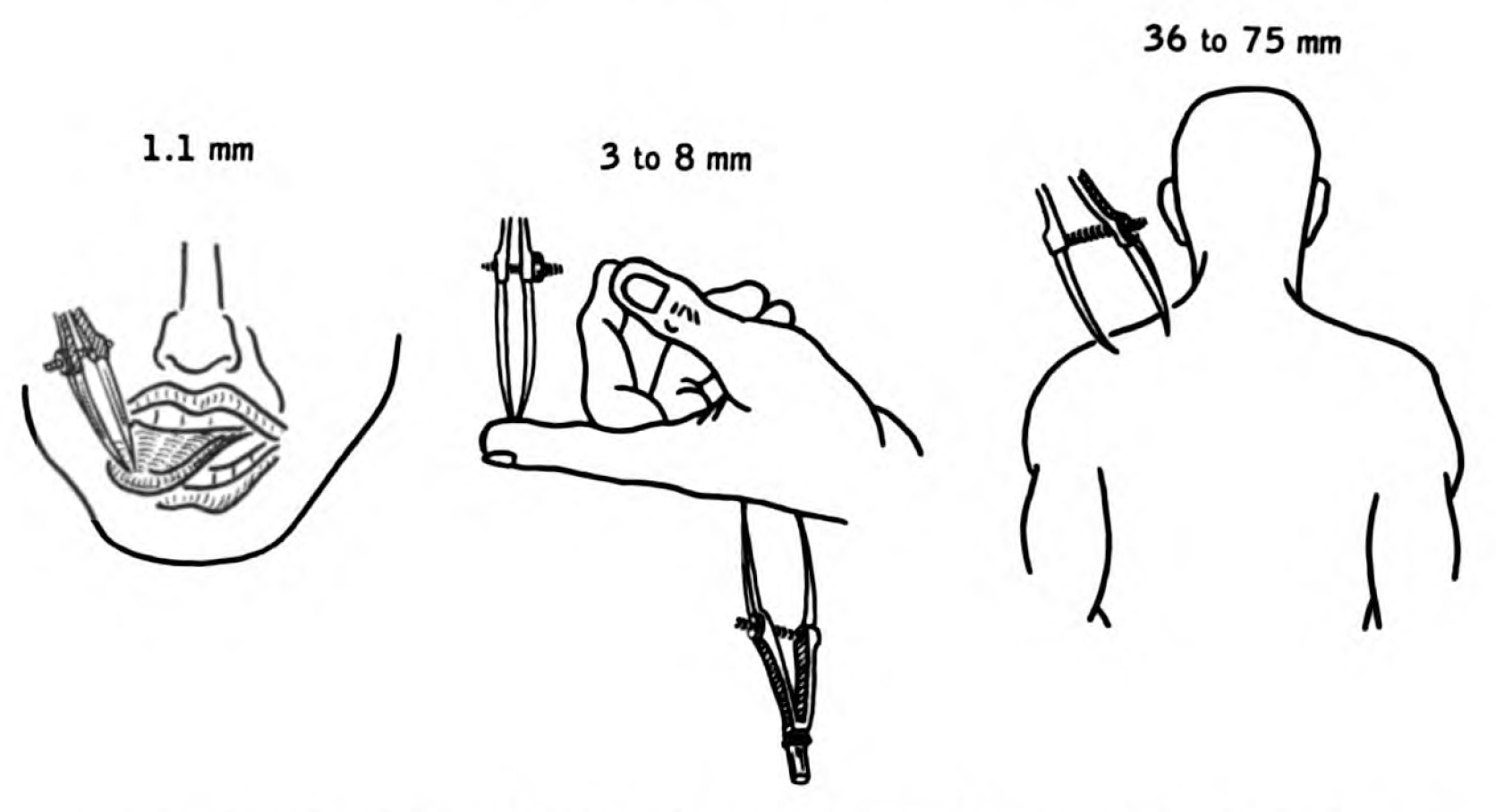
- Different areas of the body have receptive fields of different sizes, giving some better resolution in two-point discrimination. Areas including the fingertips, lips, and tongue have very high resolution, and therefore are the most sensitive. Other areas like the forearms, calves, and back are the least sensitive. This is illustrated as the distance where the two points can be felt as separate.

Two-point discrimination (2PD) is the ability to discern that two nearby objects touching the skin are truly two distinct points, not one. It is often tested with two sharp points during a neurological examination and is assumed to reflect how finely innervated an area of skin is.

In clinical settings, two-point discrimination is a widely used technique for assessing tactile perception. It relies on the ability and/or willingness of the patient to subjectively report what they are feeling and should be completed with the patient's eyes closed. The therapist may use calipers or simply a reshaped paperclip to do the testing. The therapist may alternate randomly between touching the patient with one point or with two points on the area being tested (e.g. finger, arm, leg, toe). The patient is asked to report whether one or two points was felt. The smallest distance between two points that still results in the perception of two distinct stimuli is recorded as the patient's two-point threshold. Performance on the two extremities can be compared for discrepancies. Although the test is still commonly used clinically, it has been roundly criticized by many researchers as providing an invalid measure of tactile spatial acuity, and several highly regarded alternative tests have been proposed to replace it.

== Normal and impaired performance ==
Body areas differ both in tactile receptor density and somatosensory cortical representation. Normally, a person should be able to recognize two points separated by 2 to 8 mm on fingertips. On the lips, it is 2 to 4 mm, and on the palms, it is 8 to 12 mm and 30–40 mm on the shins or back (assuming the points are at the same dermatome). The posterior column-medial lemniscus pathway is responsible for carrying information involving fine, discriminative touch. Therefore, two-point discrimination can be impaired by damage to this pathway or to a peripheral nerve.

== Criticisms ==
Although two-point testing is commonly used clinically, evidence accumulated from many research studies indicates that 2PD is a flawed measure of tactile spatial acuity. Research studies have shown that the two-point test may have low sensitivity, failing to detect or underestimating sensory deficits, that it only poorly tracks recovery of function following nerve injury and repair, that it has poor test-retest reliability, and that it fails to correlate with validated measures of tactile spatial acuity such as grating orientation discrimination. Two-point testing has been criticized for yielding highly variable performance both across and within participants, for being reliant on the subjective criterion adopted by the participant for reporting "one" compared to "two," and for resulting in performance that is "too good to be true," as the measured two-point threshold can fall — unrealistically — well below the skin's receptor spacing.

It has long been recognized that, if not pressed precisely simultaneously, two points may evoke temporally distinguishable neural activations; two points may be distinguished from one, then, not because two points are perceived spatially, but because two contacts are perceived temporally. Furthermore, neurophysiological recordings have shown that two points evoke a different number of action potentials in the receptor population than one point does; two points may be distinguished from one, then, not because two points are actually perceived, but merely because the two-point configuration produces a different overall response magnitude. In summary, the two-point task can present both a non-spatial temporal cue and a non-spatial magnitude cue. To an observant participant, these unintended non-spatial cues could signal the presence of two points compared to one, even when the points are placed closer together than the participant's spatial resolution.

On the basis of these observations, several researchers have strongly warned against the use of the 2PD task. Pointing to "the enormous and implausible variability in reported 2PD levels after nerve repair," the authors of one article "conclude that ... 2PD ... as the sole test for tactile gnosis recovery should be seriously questioned." Comparing 2PD thresholds to functional recovery in patients following nerve repair, another author states "The conclusion to be drawn from this data is that 2 P.D. is not a valid index of the sensory capacity underlying integrated hand function." The author of a book on nerve repair concludes that 2PD is a "convenient but critically flawed procedure" that "presents nonspatial cues that can be learned to improve performance without physiologic change". The authors of an article tersely entitled "The two-point threshold: Not a measure of tactile spatial resolution" recommend alternative tests to supplant the 2PD test. The authors of yet another research article concur and strongly recommend "that clinicians and researchers simply set aside the 2PD task and replace it with one that ensures a more purely spatial measure of acuity".

== Alternative tests ==
Several highly regarded tactile tests have been developed as rigorous replacements to the 2PD test. In psychophysics research laboratories, a favored test of tactile spatial acuity has for many years been the grating orientation task (GOT). In the GOT, the participant attempts to discern the orientation of parallel grooves pressed either along or across the fingertip. The GOT threshold is the groove width at which the participant performs with some specified level of accuracy (e.g., 75% correct). The GOT is considered to yield a valid measure of tactile spatial acuity and has been used in many research studies, with both manual and automated stimulus delivery protocols. For example, the GOT has been used to map spatial acuity on different body areas, to characterize how tactile spatial acuity is affected by age, sex, skin characteristics, and blindness, and to track the changes in tactile spatial acuity that occur during perceptual learning and recovery from nerve injury.

Although it is very popular in tactile research labs, the GOT is admittedly less practical for clinical use, as it requires specialized pre-constructed stimulus objects, which span a fixed spatial range, rather than a single continuously adjustable calipers. The comparative simplicity and flexibility of the 2PD test have encouraged the continuation of its use by clinicians, despite the test's acknowledged flaws. To remedy this situation, two-point orientation discrimination (2POD) has been proposed as a test that combines the convenience of 2PD with the validity of the GOT. In the 2POD task, the patient attempts to discern the orientation (e.g., along or across the finger) created by two sharp points of contact on the skin; the 2POD threshold is the distance between the points at which the participant performs with some specified level of accuracy (e.g., 75% correct).

As explained above, the validity of the 2PD task has been called into question because it allows the participant to rely on non-spatial cues. By contrast, the GOT and 2POD tasks are considered to yield valid measures of tactile spatial acuity, because in order to perform these tasks, the participant must discern the spatial modulation of the neural discharge of underlying skin receptors and cannot rely on non-spatial cues. The following figure, from a study that evaluated both 2PD and 2POD on the fingertip, finger base, palm and forearm, demonstrates that 2PD is contaminated by non-spatial cues, whereas 2POD provides an uncontaminated measure of tactile spatial acuity.

Traditional two-point discrimination (2PD) compared to 2-point orientation discrimination (2POD)

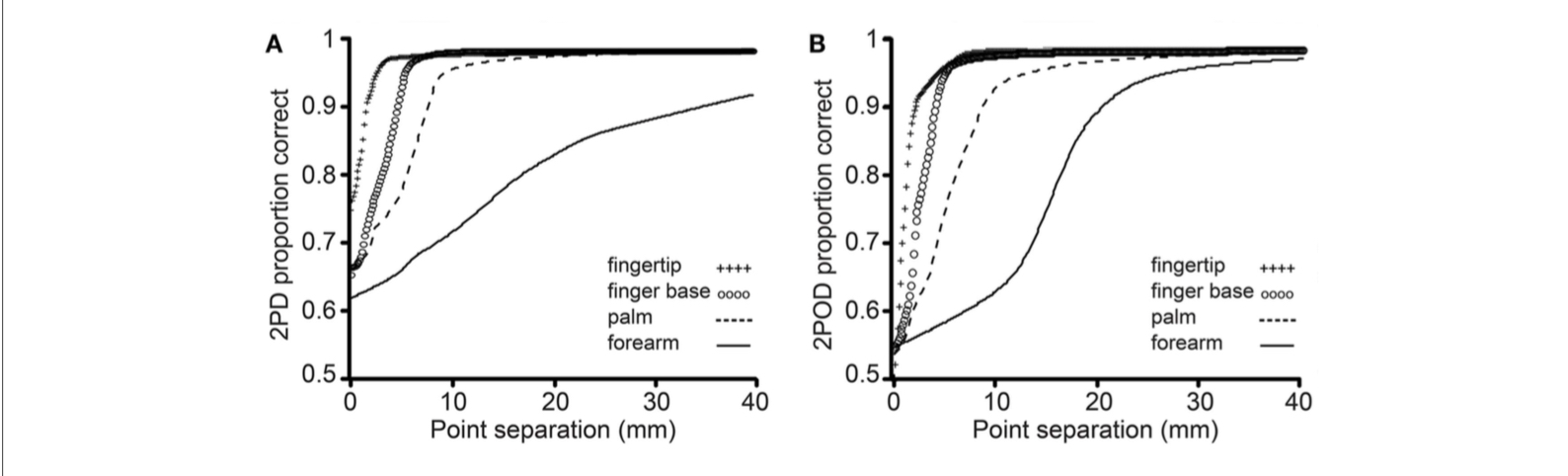
Traditional two-point discrimination compared to two-point orientation discrimination.

Tong et al. (2013) tested 24 neurologically healthy participants on four skin sites, using both two-point discrimination (2PD) and two-point orientation discrimination (2POD). All participants were tested on both tasks, using the same fine-tipped calipers and an objective two-interval forced-choice protocol. The order of testing was counterbalanced across participants. Mean proportion correct versus calliper tip separation is shown for (A) 2PD and (B) 2POD. Note that 2PD performance (A) is significantly above chance even at zero mm separation, as found also in previous research; this indicates that 2PD is not a valid measure of tactile spatial acuity. In contrast, 2POD performance (B) falls to chance level (50% correct) as separation approaches zero mm, as required for a valid measure of spatial acuity. On the basis of these results, the authors recommend that clinicians discard the 2PD task and replace it with 2POD.
