= Special somatic afferent fibers =

Afferent nerve fibers

Special somatic afferent fibers (SSA) are the afferent nerve fibers that carry information from the special senses of vision, hearing and balance. The cranial nerves containing SSA fibers are the optic nerve (CN II) and the vestibulocochlear nerve (CN VIII).

== See also ==
- General somatic afferent fiber (GSA)
- General visceral afferent fiber (GVA)
- Special visceral afferent fiber (SVA)
