= Posterior median sulcus of medulla oblongata =

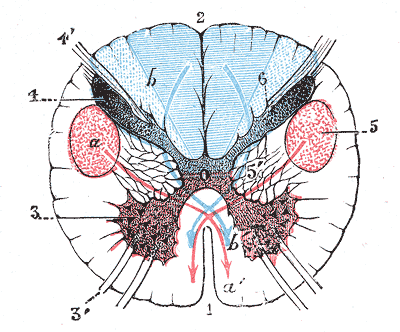
- Section of the medulla oblongata through the lower part of the decussation of the pyramids.: 1. Anterior median fissure 2. Posterior median sulcus 3. Anterior column (in red), with 3’, anterior root 4. Posterior column (in blue), with 4’, posterior roots 5. Lateral cerebrospinal fasciculus 6. Posterior funiculus; The red arrow, a, a’, indicates the course the lateral cerebrospinal fasciculus takes at the level of the decussation of the pyramids; the blue arrow, b, b’, indicates the course which the sensory fibers take.

- Spinal cord (Dorsal-median sulcus is "s1")

Details

Identifiers
- Latin: sulcus medianus posterior medullae oblongatae
- NeuroNames: 708
- TA98: A14.1.04.020; A14.1.05.703
- TA2: 5994
- FMA: 83795

The posterior median sulcus of medulla oblongata (or posterior median fissure or dorsal median sulcus) is a narrow groove; and exists only in the closed part of the medulla oblongata; it becomes gradually shallower from below upward, and finally ends about the middle of the medulla oblongata, where the central canal expands into the cavity of the fourth ventricle.

== Additional images ==
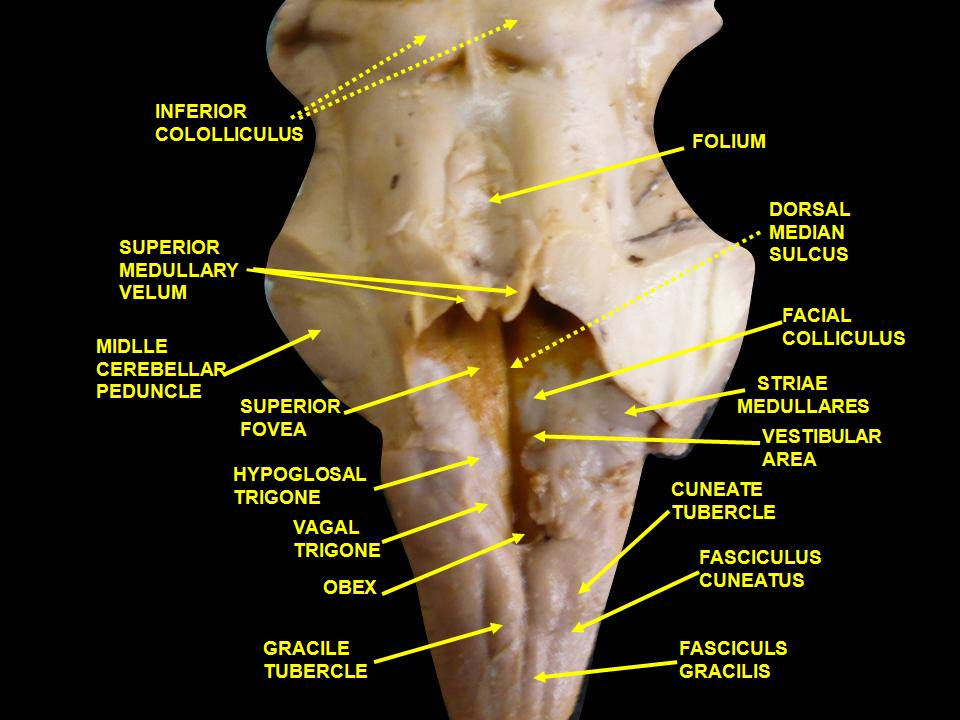
Fourth ventricle. Posterioe view.Deep dissection.
