= Special visceral efferent fibers =

Nerve fibers providing motor innervation

Special visceral efferent fibers (SVE) are the efferent nerve fibers that provide motor innervation to the muscles of the pharyngeal arches in humans, and the branchial arches in fish.

Some sources prefer the term "branchiomotor" or "branchial efferent".

The only nerves containing SVE fibers are cranial nerves: the trigeminal nerve (V), the facial nerve (VII), the glossopharyngeal nerve (IX), the vagus nerve (X) and the accessory nerve (XI).

== See also ==
- General somatic efferent fiber (GSE)
- General visceral efferent fiber (GVE)
