= Special visceral afferent fiber =

Special visceral afferent fibers (SVA) are afferent fibers that develop in association with the gastrointestinal tract. They carry the special sense of taste (gustation). The cranial nerves containing SVA fibers are the facial nerve (VII), the glossopharyngeal nerve (IX), and the vagus nerve (X). The facial nerve receives taste from the anterior 2/3 of the tongue; the glossopharyngeal from the posterior 1/3, and the vagus nerve from the epiglottis. The sensory processes, using their primary cell bodies from the inferior ganglion, send projections to the medulla, from which they travel in the tractus solitarius, later terminating at the rostral nucleus solitarius.

== See also ==
- General somatic afferent fiber (GSA)
- General visceral afferent fiber (GVA)
- Special somatic afferent fiber (SSA)
