= Anterolateral sulcus of medulla =

Groove of the brainstem

Anterolateral sulcus
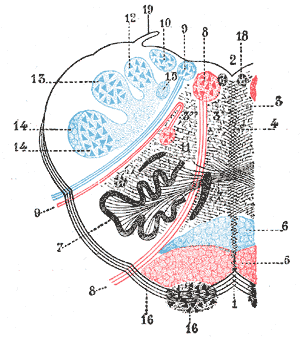
- Anterolateral sulcus is visible at #8.

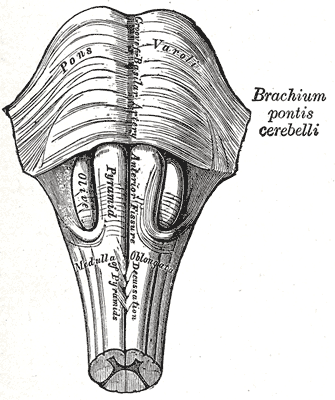
- Anteroinferior view of the medulla oblongata and pons. (Anterolateral sulcus visible but not labeled.)

Details

Identifiers
- Latin: sulcus anterolateralis medullae oblongatae
- NeuroNames: 710
- TA98: A14.1.04.005
- TA2: 5986
- FMA: 83797

The anterolateral sulcus (or ventrolateral sulcus) is a sulcus on the side of the medulla oblongata between the olive and pyramid. The rootlets of the hypoglossal nerve (CN XII) emerge from this sulcus.

== See also ==
- Anterolateral sulcus of spinal cord
