= Posterolateral sulcus of medulla oblongata =

Groove in the brainstem

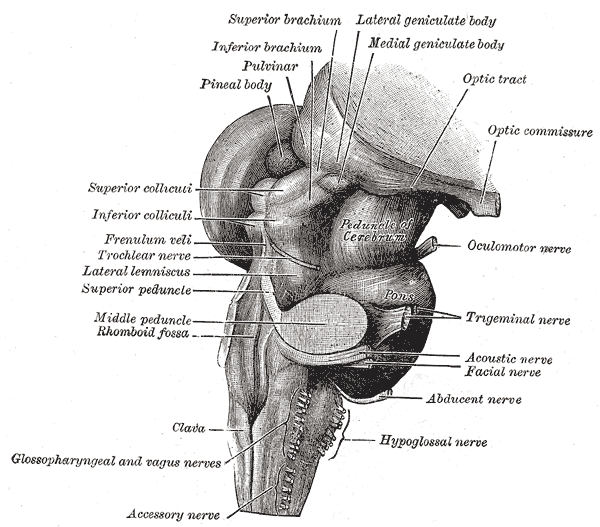
- Hind- and mid-brains; postero-lateral view.

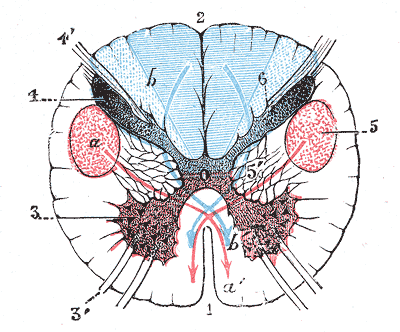
- Section of the medulla oblongata through the lower part of the decussation of the pyramids.: 1. Anterior median fissure 2. Posterior median sulcus 3. Anterior column (in red), with 3’, anterior root 4. Posterior column (in blue), with 4’, posterior roots 5. Lateral cerebrospinal fasciculus 6. Posterior funiculus; The red arrow, a, a’, indicates the course the lateral cerebrospinal fasciculus takes at the level of the decussation of the pyramids; the blue arrow, b, b’, indicates the course which the sensory fibers take.

Details

Identifiers
- Latin: sulcus posterolateralis medullae oblongatae
- NeuroNames: 706
- TA98: A14.1.04.012
- TA2: 5991
- FMA: 75608

The accessory, vagus, and glossopharyngeal nerves correspond with the posterior nerve roots, and are attached to the bottom of a sulcus named the posterolateral sulcus (or dorsolateral sulcus).

== Additional images ==
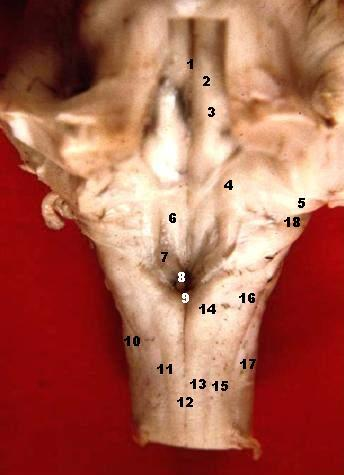
Human caudal brainstem posterior view description
