= Anterolateral sulcus of spinal cord =

Anatomical landmark of the spinal cord

- Spinal cord (Ventrolateral sulcus is "s5")

Details

Identifiers
- Latin: sulcus anterolateralis medullae spinalis
- TA98: A14.1.02.010
- TA2: 6054
- FMA: 79877

The Anterolateral sulcus of spinal cord is a landmark on the anterior side of the spinal cord. It denotes the location at which the ventral fibers leave the spinal cord.

The anterolateral sulcus is less visible than the posterolateral sulcus.

== See also ==
- Anterolateral sulcus of medulla
