= Posterolateral sulcus of spinal cord =

Anatomical landmark of the spinal cord

- Spinal cord (Dorsolateral sulcus is "s3")

Details

Identifiers
- Latin: sulcus posterolateralis medullae spinalis
- TA98: A14.1.02.011
- TA2: 6055
- FMA: 75609

On either side of the posterior median sulcus of the spinal cord, and at a short distance from it, the posterior nerve roots are attached along a vertical furrow named the posterolateral sulcus. The portion of the medulla spinalis which lies between this and the posterior median sulcus is named the posterior funiculus.
