= General visceral efferent fiber =

Autonomic nervous system nerve fiber

General visceral efferent fibers
- Scheme showing structure of a typical spinal nerve.: 1. Somatic efferent.; 2. Somatic afferent.; 3,4,5. Sympathetic efferent. 6,7. Sympathetic afferent.

General visceral efferent fibers (GVE), visceral efferents or autonomic efferents are the efferent nerve fibers of the autonomic nervous system (also known as the visceral efferent nervous system) that provide motor innervation to smooth muscle, cardiac muscle, and glands (contrast with special visceral efferent (SVE) fibers) through postganglionic varicosities.

GVE fibers may be either sympathetic or parasympathetic. Cranial and sacral spinal fibers are parasympathetic GVE fibers, while thoracic and lumbar spinal cord give rise to sympathetic GVE fibers.

The cranial nerves containing GVE fibers include the oculomotor nerve (CN III), the facial nerve (CN VII), the glossopharyngeal nerve (CN IX) and the vagus nerve (CN X).

== Additional images ==
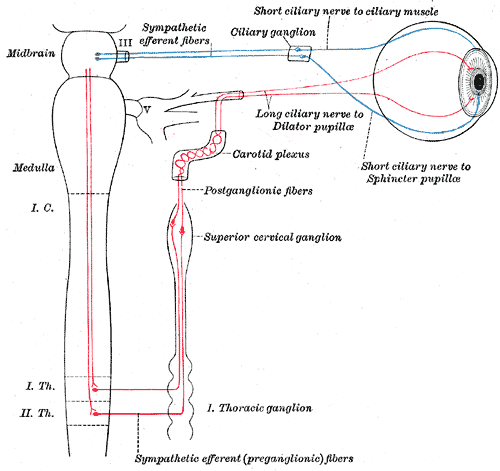
Sympathetic connections of the ciliary and superior cervical ganglia.

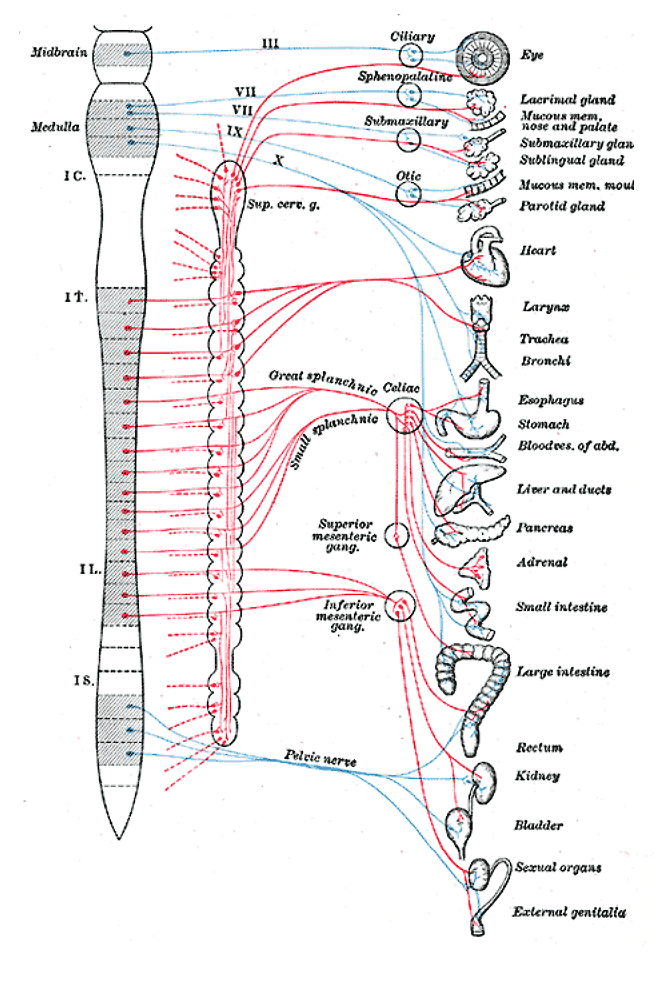
Autonomic nervous system overview.

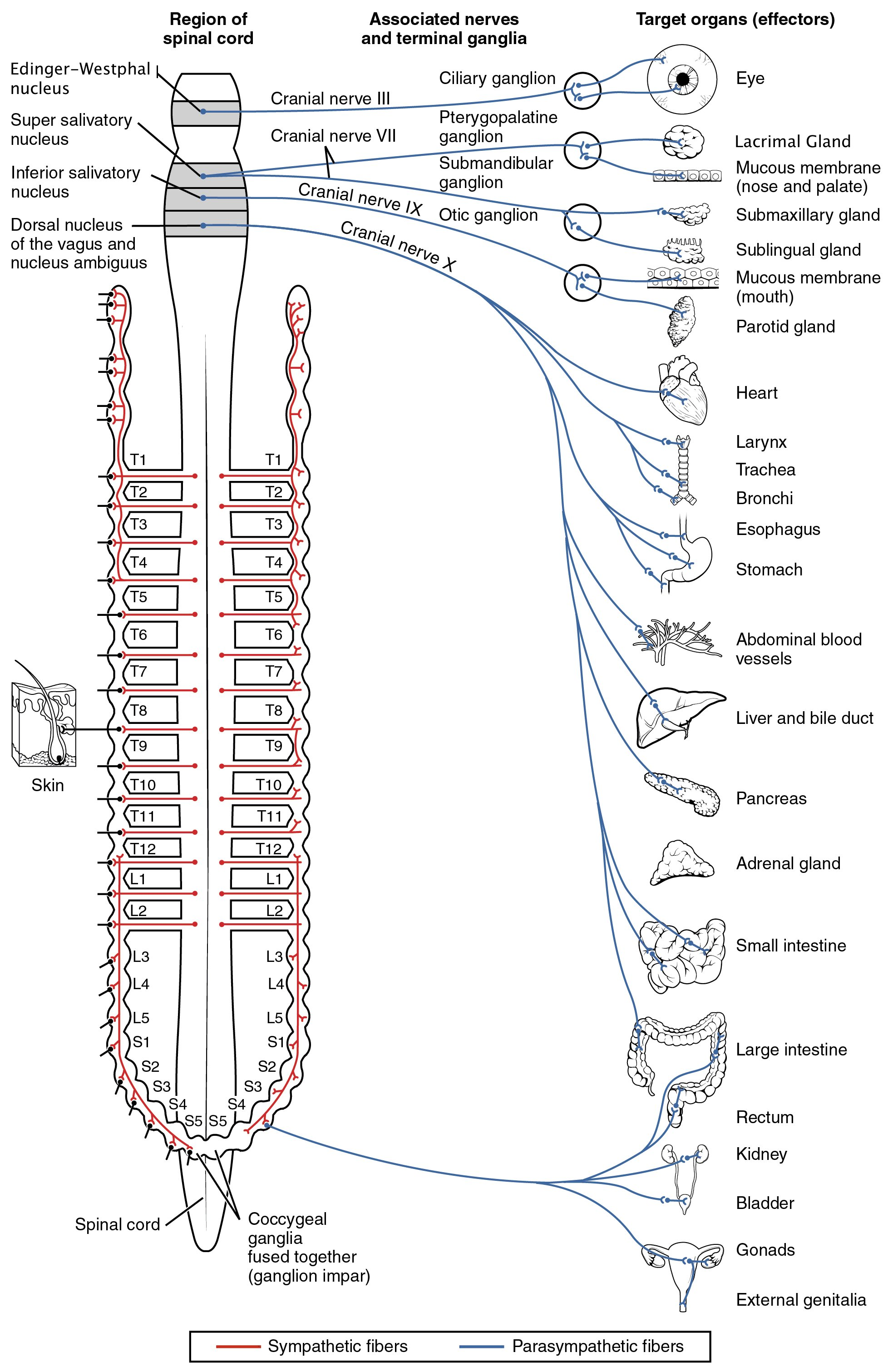
Autonomic nervous system, particularly illustrates parasympathetic fibers.

== See also ==
- Nerve fiber
- Preganglionic fibers
- Efferent nerve
- General somatic efferent fiber (GSE)
- Special visceral efferent fiber (SVE)
