= General somatic efferent fiber =

Nerve fiber

General somatic efferent fibers
- Scheme showing structure of a typical spinal nerve.: 1. Somatic efferent.; 2. Somatic afferent.; 3,4,5. Sympathetic efferent. 6,7. Sympathetic afferent.

The general (spinal) somatic efferent neurons (GSE, somatomotor, or somatic motor fibers) arise from motor neuron cell bodies in the ventral horns of the gray matter within the spinal cord. They exit the spinal cord through the ventral roots, carrying motor impulses to skeletal muscle through a neuromuscular junction.

Of the somatic efferent neurons, there exist subtypes.

- Alpha motor neurons (α) target extrafusal muscle fibers.
- Gamma motor neurons (γ) target intrafusal muscle fibres

Cranial nerves also supply their own somatic efferent neurons to the extraocular muscles and some of the muscles of the tongue.

== See also ==
- Nerve fiber
- Efferent nerve
- General visceral efferent fiber (GVE)
- Special visceral efferent fiber (SVE)
