= Dorsal column nuclei =

Nuclei in the dorsal column of the brainstem

Identifiers
- NeuroLex ID: nlx_153860

Dorsal column nuclei
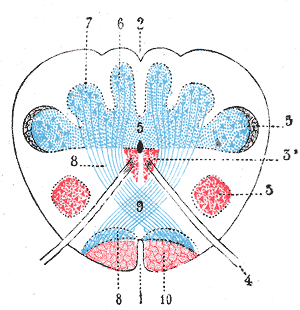
- Present at the junction between the spinal cord and medulla oblongata, the dorsal column nuclei consist of paired gracile, and cuneate nuclei (labels 6 and 7, respectively).

Details
- System: Somatosensory system

Identifiers
- NeuroLex ID: nlx_153860

The dorsal column nuclei are a pair of nuclei in the dorsal columns of the dorsal column–medial lemniscus pathway (DCML) in the brainstem. The name refers collectively to the cuneate nucleus and gracile nucleus, which are situated at the lower end of the medulla oblongata. Both nuclei contain second-order neurons of the DCML, which convey fine touch and proprioceptive information from the body to the brain via the thalamus.

== Structure ==
=== Nerve pathways ===
The dorsal column nuclei each have an associated nerve tract in the spinal cord, the gracile fasciculus and the cuneate fasciculus, together forming the dorsal columns. Both dorsal column nuclei contain synapses from afferent nerve fibers that have travelled in the spinal cord. They then send on second-order neurons of the dorsal column–medial lemniscal pathway.

Neurons of the dorsal column nuclei eventually reach the midbrain and the thalamus. They send axons that form the internal arcuate fibers. These cross over at the sensory decussation to form the medial lemniscus. They then synapse with third-order neurons of the thalamus.

=== Nuclei ===
The major nuclei are the cuneate nucleus and gracile nucleus. These are present at the bottom of the medulla oblongata.

==== Gracile nucleus ====
The gracile nucleus is medial to the cuneate nucleus. Its neurons receive afferent input from dorsal root ganglia sensory neurons of the lower torso and the lower limbs. The gracile nucleus and gracile fasciculus carry epicritic, kinesthetic, and conscious proprioceptive information from the lower part of the body (below the level of T6 in the spinal cord). Because of the large population of neurons in the gracile nucleus they give rise to a raised area called the gracile tubercle on the posterior side of the closed medulla at the floor of the fourth ventricle.

==== Cuneate nucleus ====
The cuneate nucleus is lateral to the gracile nucleus. It carries the same type of information, but from the upper body and the upper limbs (except the face, which is carried by the principal sensory nucleus of trigeminal nerve). The cuneate nucleus is wedge-shaped and located in the closed part of the medulla. It lies lateral to the gracile nucleus and medial to the spinal trigeminal nucleus in the medulla. The large number of neurons found there give rise to the cuneate tubercle seen on viewing the posterior aspect of the medulla on the side of the brainstem.

== Function ==
The dorsal column nuclei help to carry fine touch and proprioceptive information from the body to the brain. The gracile nucleus carries information from the lower torso and the lower limbs. The cuneate nucleus carries information from the upper body and the upper limbs.

== Clinical significance ==
The dorsal column nuclei may degenerate during ageing, although evidence for this is not conclusive. This may reduce the sensitivity of touch and proprioception.

== Other animals ==
In some other animals, a third nucleus is present, known as the median accessory nucleus. This may carry information from the tail.

== Additional images ==
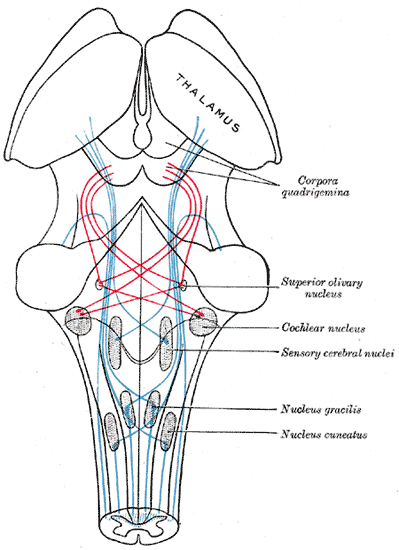
Scheme showing the course of the fibers of the lemniscus; medial lemniscus in blue, lateral in red.

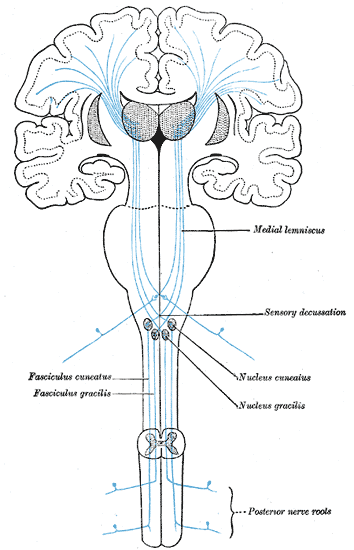
The sensory tract.

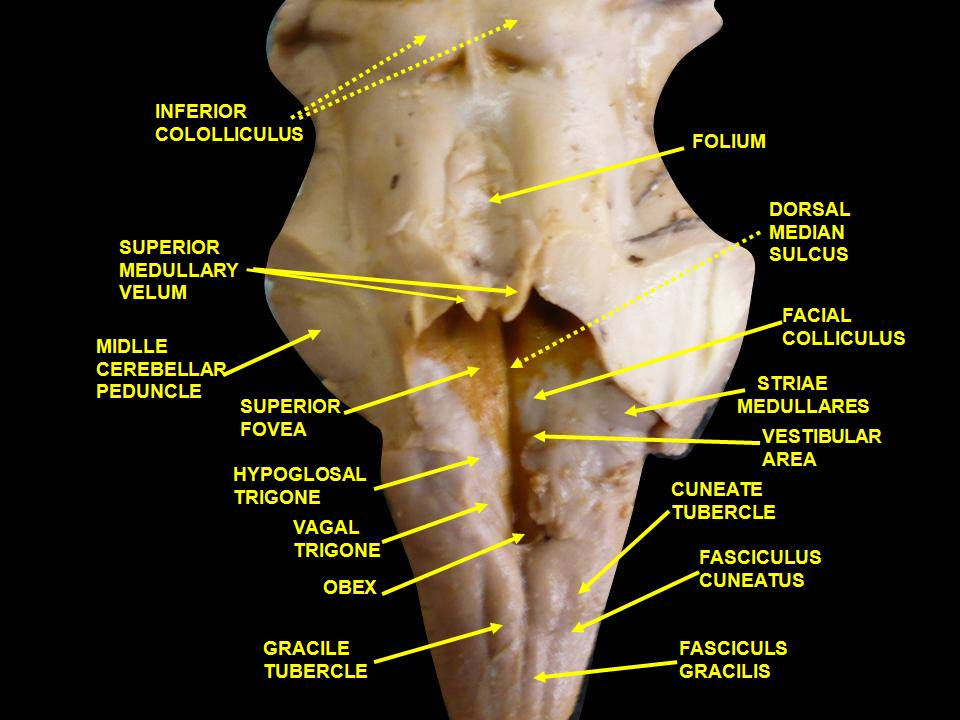
Fourth ventricle. Posterior view. Deep dissection.
