= Anterior median fissure of the medulla oblongata =

Anatomical furrow of the brain

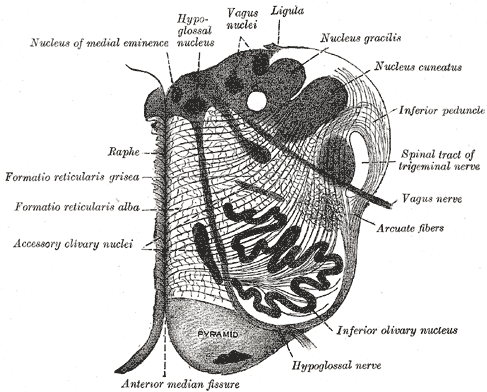
- Section of the medulla oblongata at about the middle of the olive. (Anterior median fissure labeled at bottom center.)

Details

Identifiers
- Latin: fissura mediana anterior medullae oblongatae
- NeuroNames: 700
- TA98: A14.1.04.001
- TA2: 5984
- FMA: 83734

The anterior median fissure (ventral or ventromedian fissure) contains a fold of pia mater, and extends along the entire length of the medulla oblongata: It ends at the lower border of the pons in a small triangular expansion, termed the foramen cecum.

Its lower part is interrupted by bundles of fibers that cross obliquely from one side to the other, and constitute the pyramidal decussation.

Some fibers, termed the anterior external arcuate fibers, emerge from the fissure above this decussation and curve lateralward and upward over the surface of the medulla oblongata to join the inferior peduncle.

== Additional images ==
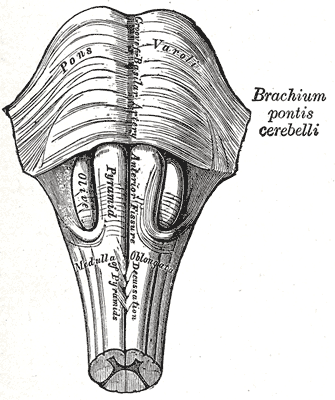
Medulla oblongata and pons. Anterior surface.

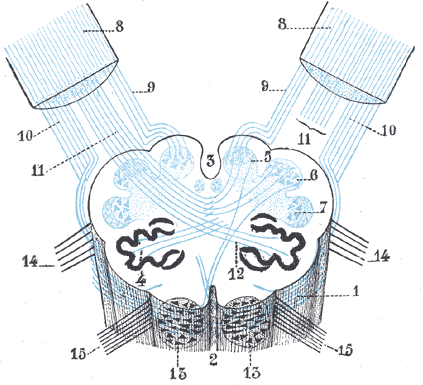
Diagram showing the course of the arcuate fibers.

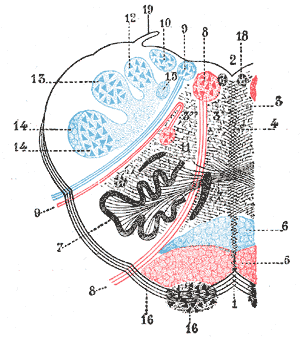
The reticular formation of the medulla oblongata, shown by a transverse section passing through the middle of the olive.
