= Posterior median sulcus of spinal cord =

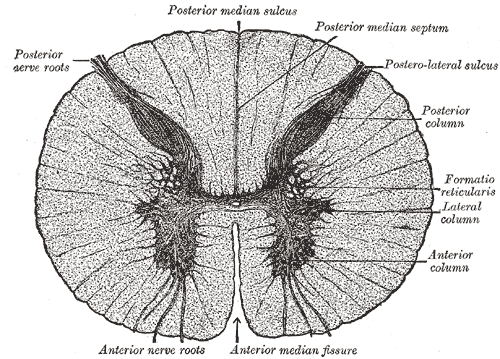
- Transverse section of the medulla spinalis in the mid-thoracic region.

Details

Identifiers
- Latin: sulcus medianus posterior medullae spinalis
- TA98: A14.1.02.008
- TA2: 6057
- FMA: 83798

The posterior median sulcus is the posterior end of the posterior median septum of neuroglia of the spinal cord. The septum varies in depth from 4 to 6 mm, but diminishes considerably in the lower part of the spinal cord.
