= General somatic afferent fiber =

Type of afferent fiber

General somatic afferent fibers
- Scheme showing structure of a typical spinal nerve.: 1. Somatic efferent.; 2. Somatic afferent.; 3,4,5. Sympathetic efferent. 6,7. Autonomic afferent.

The general somatic afferent fibers (GSA or somatic sensory fibers) are afferent fibers that arise from neurons in sensory ganglia and are found in all the spinal nerves, except occasionally the first cervical. General somatic afferents conduct impulses of pain, touch and temperature from the surface of the body through the dorsal roots to the spinal cord, and impulses of muscle sense, tendon sense and joint sense from the deeper structures.

== See also ==
- Afferent nerve
- General visceral afferent fiber (GVA)
- Special somatic afferent fiber (SSA)
- Special visceral afferent fiber (SVA)
