= General visceral afferent fiber =

Part of the autonomic nervous system

General visceral afferent fibers
- Scheme showing pathways of a typical spinal nerve.: 1. Somatic efferent.; 2. Somatic afferent.; 3,4,5. Sympathetic efferent. 6,7. Autonomic nervous system (ANS) afferent. This image merely depicts pathways in a schematic fashion – it is not anatomically correct. The efferent sympathetics exit in a loop.

The general visceral afferent (GVA) fibers conduct sensory impulses (usually pain or reflex sensations) from the internal organs, glands, and blood vessels to the central nervous system. They are considered to be part of the visceral nervous system, which is closely related to the autonomic nervous system, but 'visceral nervous system' and 'autonomic nervous system' are not direct synonyms and care should be taken when using these terms. Unlike the efferent fibers of the autonomic nervous system, the afferent fibers are not classified as either sympathetic or parasympathetic.

GVA fibers create referred pain by activating general somatic afferent fibers where the two meet in the posterior grey column.

The cranial nerves that contain GVA fibers include the glossopharyngeal nerve (CN IX) and the vagus nerve (CN X).

Generally, they are insensitive to cutting, crushing or burning; however, excessive tension in smooth muscle and some pathological conditions produce visceral pain (referred pain).

== Pathway ==
=== Abdomen ===
In the abdomen, general visceral afferent fibers usually accompany sympathetic efferent fibers. This means that a signal traveling in an afferent fiber will begin at sensory receptors in the afferent fiber's target organ, travel up to the ganglion where the sympathetic efferent fiber synapses, continue back along a splanchnic nerve from the ganglion into the sympathetic trunk, move into a ventral ramus via a white ramus communicans, and finally move into the mixed spinal nerve between the division of the rami and the division of the roots of the spinal nerve. The GVA pathway then diverges from the sympathetic efferent pathway, which follows the ventral root into the spinal column, by following the dorsal root into the dorsal root ganglion, where the cell body of the visceral afferent nerve is located. Finally, the signal continues along the dorsal root from the dorsal root ganglion to a region of gray matter in the dorsal horn of the spinal column where it is transmitted via a synapse to a neuron in the central nervous system.

The only GVA nerves in the abdomen that do not follow the above pathway are those that innervate structures in the distal half of the sigmoid colon and the rectum. These afferent fibers, instead, follow the path of parasympathetic efferent fibers back to the vertebral column, where the afferent fibers enter the S2-S4 sensory (dorsal root) ganglia followed by the spinal cord.

=== Pelvis ===
The course of GVA fibers from organs in the pelvis, in general, depends on the organ's position relative to the pelvic pain line. An organ, or part of an organ, in the pelvis is said to be "above the pelvic pain line" if it is in contact with the peritoneum, except in the case of the large intestine, where the pelvic pain line is said to be located in the middle of the sigmoid colon. GVA fibers from structures above the pain line follow the course of the sympathetic efferent fibers, and GVA fibers from structures below the pain line follow the course of the parasympathetic efferents. Pain from the latter fibers is less likely to be consciously experienced.

== Neurotransmitters ==
For many of these visceral afferents, their endings in the periphery and in the spinal cord contain substance P and other neuropeptides of the tachykinin family, such as neurokinin A and neurokinin B, specifically in the sympathetic portion of these fibres.

== See also ==
- General visceral efferent fiber (GVE)
- Referred pain
- General somatic afferent fiber (GSA)
- Special somatic afferent fiber (SSA)
- Special visceral afferent fiber (SVA)
