= Mesaxon =

In neurobiology, a mesaxon is a pair of parallel plasma membranes of a Schwann cell. It marks the point of edge-to-edge contact by the Schwann cell encircling the axon. A single Schwann cell of the peripheral nervous system will wrap around and support only one individual axon (then myelinated; ratio of 1:1), while the oligodendrocytes found in the central nervous system can wrap around and support 5-8 axons. Thin unmyelinated axons are often bundled, with several unmyelinated axons to a single mesaxon (and several such groups to a single Schwann cell).

The outer mesaxon (Terminologia histologica: Mesaxon externum) is the connection of the outer cell membrane to the compact myelin sheath. The inner mesaxon (Terminologia histologica: Mesaxon internum) is the connection between the myelin sheath and the inner part of the cell membrane of the Schwann cell, which is directly opposite the axolemma, i.e. the cell membrane of the nerve fibre ensheathed by the Schwann cell.
