= Preferential motor reinnervation =

Preferential motor reinnervation (PMR) refers to the tendency of a regenerating axon in the peripheral nervous system (PNS) to reinnervate a motor pathway as opposed to a somatosensory pathway. PMR affects how nerves regenerate and reinnervate within the PNS after surgical procedures or traumatic injuries. It is important to understand in order to further develop axonal regrowth surgical techniques. Further research of preferential motor reinnervation will lead to a better understanding of peripheral nervous system function in the human body regarding cell roles and abilities.

== Summary ==
=== Motor vs sensory nerve reinnervation ===
Nervous System Organization - The Motor and Sensory Systems

The peripheral nervous system has the ability to regrow cut nerves. Motor axons preferentially reinnervate motor pathways. The tendency of motor axons to reinnervate motor pathways instead of cutaneous pathways is influenced by a number of factors in the PNS system. Some factors include Schwann cell characteristics, neurotrophic factors, and nerve branch size. These factors influence the pathway preference of the motor neuron. The different nervous systems are illustrated in the image displayed on the right. Preferential motor reinnervation is a tendency that is specifically seen in the peripheral nervous system, which is illustrated in the photos of the bottom of the system shown.

=== Regeneration vs reinnervation ===
When peripheral axons are severed, the distal part of the cut axon degenerates. The only remaining distal parts from the original nerve are the Schwann cells which myelinate the peripheral axons. The basal lamina components that the Schwann cells secrete help to guide axon regeneration. The more precisely the axon stump is able to regrow along its original path, the better the recovery of function – especially when it comes to experiencing fine touch and movements. The growth of the axon stump to its original target is regeneration. Reinnervation on the other hand, is the recovery of function through reestablishing synaptic connections. Even though the original axon degenerates, the Schwann cells and acetylcholine receptors remain in place, allowing for the junction to reestablish the original synapses once the axon stump regenerates. In medical jargon, regeneration and reinnervation are not commonly distinguished. Regardless of the fact that there is a technical difference, many professionals use the terms interchangeably. This is because without regeneration, there would not be a nerve to innervate, but without reinnervation, the nerve would not function.

=== PMR relevancy ===
Knowledge of preferential motor reinnervation is necessary because of how it affects the regeneration of nerves. When a patient loses nerve function, PMR can interfere with (or help) the different methods of repair that physicians use. Physicians understanding of natural nerve repair processes will allow for overall improvement in surgery, because they will be able to better interface their repair efforts with natural ones. Axon reinnervation is greatly affected by the pathway the regenerated nerve has chosen to grow along. The nerves' ability to properly function after damage is very dependent on successful reinnervation, which is why the effects of PMR are so relevant. The success of nerve reinnervation after different grafting attempts is a current research area. Grafting aims to solve the problem of incorrect targeting of regenerating axons, resulting in less-than-perfect reinnervation. PMR effects are being investigated to see how they can help grafting, and ultimately patient recovery.

== How do nerves regrow? ==
=== A cut nerve regenerating ===
A cut axon in the peripheral nervous system has two parts: a distal and a proximal axon stump. The space in between the two stumps is known as the gap, and it is what the nerve must grow through in order to fully regenerate and reinnervate. The distal axon is degenerated through the body's own mechanisms, mostly macrophage consumption and enzymes breaking it down. The proximal part of the cut axon is often able to regenerate. The regeneration and reinnervation of the cut nerve are affected by multiple factors, including how far the nerve must regrow, what kind of environment it is growing in, and the different Schwann cells and pathway options available. PMR indicates that a regenerating motor neuron will choose a motor pathway Schwann cell over a cutaneous pathway Schwann cell when regenerating.

=== The role of Schwann cells ===
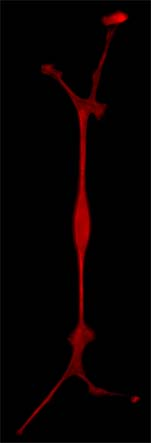
Cultured Schwann cell

Schwann cells are the myelination cells that surround nerves. When multiple nerves are cut, they must regrow and enter back through one of the Schwann cells that makes up the distal stump of the gap. These Schwann cells support axonal regrowth through their production of trophic factors as well as surface expression of multiple cell adhesion molecules that help influence axonal growth.

=== Neurotrophic support ===
Neurotrophic factors are support proteins and factors that help assist in the growth and maintenance of axons throughout the body. Different cells emanate different proteins, but the ones specific to the peripheral nervous system play a major role in regeneration of cut nerves in the peripheral nervous system. In relation to reinnervation, neurotrophic support is key in assisting with supporting the regeneration of axons. Some discussion has led investigators to believe that neurotrophic factors only led to more axonal sprouting rather than actually influencing the regeneration. The ability of neurotrophic factors to influence the sprouting of axons has been seen with electron microscopic images and in multiple studies extensively detailed in a review of the role of neurotrophic factors in regeneration. In addition to the ability of the factors to influence sprouting, Schwann cells in particular show a significant upregulation of a number of trophic factors after undergoing axotomy. One major difference in motor and sensory pathways is the difference in what trophic factors are upregulated by the Schwann cells of those pathways. Denervenated motor Schwann cells upregulate BDNF and p75, whereas sensory pathway Schwann cells upregulate a number of other varied trophic factors. This difference in trophic factor support is suspected to be a major influencer of preferential motor reinnervation. Though it is a major factor, inherent molecular differences do not alone determine the reinnervation pathway of the motor neurons, as demonstrated in a study done in a mouse femoral nerve, where the size of the pathways were manipulated, leading to incorrect motor axon pathway reinnervation.

== PMR influencing factors ==
=== End organ contact ===
End-organ contact can also have a major effect on the reinnervation accuracy of the axon. The first two weeks following the damage, it is statistically insignificant, because end-plate reinnervation is just starting. However, after that time period, end-organ contact plays a role in influencing the reinnervation ability of the axon. When the end of the pathway is a muscle contact area, there is a significant difference in the number of motor neurons reinnervating.

=== Cellular and molecular mechanisms ===
These are trophic factors that are discussed in detail in above sections. These factors can influence where an axon grows towards, mostly from chemotaxis effects that the different proteins have on the growing axon's directionality. The trophic factors differ between motor and sensory pathways, which is a major influential factor in preferential motor reinnervation.

=== Terminal nerve branch size ===
The terminal nerve branch size has a lot of influence on the reinnervation pathway of the axon. When two pathways, one cutaneous and one motor, are roughly comparable in size, the motor axons follow preferential reinnervation patterns along the motor pathways. However, enlargement of sensory pathways in the same experiment led to the motor axons to reinnervate those pathways, indicating that trophic factors alone do not cause reinnervation of motor neurons. This is shown because the motoneurons wrongly reinnervate down pathways that are sensory, thus demonstrating that the size of the terminal nerve branch pathway can affect the axonal reinnervation patterns.

=== Reinnervation accuracy ===
The ability of an axon to "choose" the accurate Schwann cell and eventually site of innervation is interconnected to preferential motor reinnervation. The specificity of a motor axon to preferentially choose the motor pathway is the very essence of preferential motor reinnervation. Additionally, it influences whether or not a nerve can truly experience full reinnervation and recovery of function that is likened to what it had before the injury. Thus, this accuracy influences whether or not a motor axon preferentially reinnervates. Different studies are investigating how an axon pathway specificity can be manipulated in order to see what kind of surgical advances can be made regarding neuron repair.

== Use in medicine ==
The varied accuracy of damaged axons regenerating and reaching their original target end is a large reason that functional recovery of damaged nerves is such a variable in the peripheral nervous system. The understanding of what Schwann cell tube axons tend to reinnervate has implications for whether a nerve will be able to become functional again after damage. If the axon is a subcutaneous axon and ends up in a motor Schwann cell tube, it will not be able to innervate the muscle it ends up connected to. Thus, understanding how axons do reinnervate, and how motor axons can be pushed towards the correct regeneration site is an area of study that is extremely beneficial in helping to advance nerve repair in the PNS system.

In 2004, a study looked at how Lewis rats' sensory vs motor nerve grafts affected the regeneration of a cut mixed nerve system (both motor and sensory nerves). It was noted that after 3 weeks, a mixed nerve defect had undergone substantial regeneration when paired with a motor nerve graft or a mixed nerve graft. In comparison, a sensory nerve graft was statistically less affective in regeneration, looking specifically at nerve fiber count, percent nerve, and nerve densities as the main three comparisons between the different grafts. This means that the best surgical practices in regenerating nerves regarding PMR is using a nerve graft that is either a motor or a combination nerve graft.

In a study published in 2009, the terminal nerve branch size was investigated to see how it affected nerve regeneration. It was discovered that the branches of similar size initially regenerated about equally between cutaneous and muscular pathways, but after a while favored muscle branch paths. The study end results predicted that axonal collateral formation at the injured site being increased could increase regeneration accuracy. Understanding PMR affects would help overall in gaining a better understanding of the forces that influence the neuron repair, which was the overall conclusion of what was needed to help nerves functionally repair. This increasing understanding will overall impact surgical and repair processes with peripheral nerve repair. Though manipulation of axonal collateral formation may help, the further understanding of PMR will allow for the surgical practices and medical advances in nerve repair to continue developing.
