= Myelin incisure =

Small pockets of cytoplasm

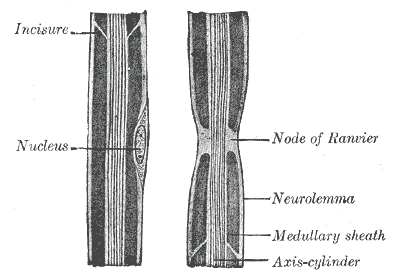
- Diagram of longitudinal sections of medullated nerve fibers. (Incisure labeled at upper left.)

Details
- System: Nervous system

Identifiers
- TH: H2.00.06.2.03015

Myelin incisures (also known as Schmidt-Lanterman clefts, Schmidt-Lanterman incisures, clefts of Schmidt-Lanterman, segments of Lanterman, medullary segments) are small pockets of cytoplasm left behind during the Schwann cell process of myelination.

They are histological evidence of the small amount of cytoplasm that remains in the inner layer of the myelin sheath created by Schwann cells wrapping tightly around an axon (nerve fiber).

== Development ==
In the peripheral nervous system (PNS) axons can be either myelinated or unmyelinated. Myelination refers to the insulation of an axon with concentric surrounding layers of lipid membrane (myelin) produced by Schwann cells. These layers are generally uniform and continuous, but due to imperfect nature of the process by which Schwann cells wrap the nerve axon, this wrapping process can sometimes leave behind small pockets of residual cytoplasm displaced to the periphery during the formation of the myelin sheath. These pockets, or "incisures", can subdivide the myelinated axon into irregular portions. These staggered clefts also provide communication channels between layers by connecting the outer collar of cytoplasm of the Schwann cell to the deepest layer of myelin sheath. Primary incisures appear ab initio in myelination and always extend across the whole radial thickness of the myelin sheath but initially around only part of its circumference. Secondary incisures appear later, in regions of a compact myelin sheath, initially traversing only part of its radial thickness but commonly occupying its whole circumference.
