= Nonmyelinating Schwann cell =

Cell type

The nonmyelinating Schwann cells are a subgroup of the Schwann cells characterized by not forming myelin.

The group of nonmyelinating Schwann cells includes the terminal Schwann cells, present at neuromuscular junctions, the Schwann cells of Remak fibers (also called Remak Schwann cells) and the Schwann cells associated with sensory structures, like tactile corpuscles and lamellar corpuscles.

== Remak Schwann cells ==
The Schwann cells of Remak fibers, or Remak Schwann cells (RSCs), are named after the German neurobiologist Robert Remak and are present in nerve fibers observed by him around 1838. In the peripheral nervous system, the Remak Schwann cells are more numerous than the myelinating Schwann cells.

They provide metabolic support to neurons, among other functions, but as no specific genetic markers have been detailed (at least as of 2017), there is still a large gap in understanding their biology independently of other Schwann cells.

== Terminal Schwann cells ==
Terminal Schwann cells (tSCs), also called perisynaptic Schwann cells,” and “teloglia", are nonmyelinating Schwann cells present at neuromuscular junctions. It is suggested that they might play a role in forming and maintaining synapses or modulating synaptic signaling.
