= Axolemma =

Cell membrane of an axon

In neuroscience, the axolemma (from Greek lemma 'membrane, envelope', and 'axo-' from axon) is the cell membrane of an axon, the branch of a neuron through which signals (action potentials) are transmitted. The axolemma is a three-layered, lipid bilayer membrane. Under standard electron microscope preparations, the structure is approximately 8 nanometers thick.

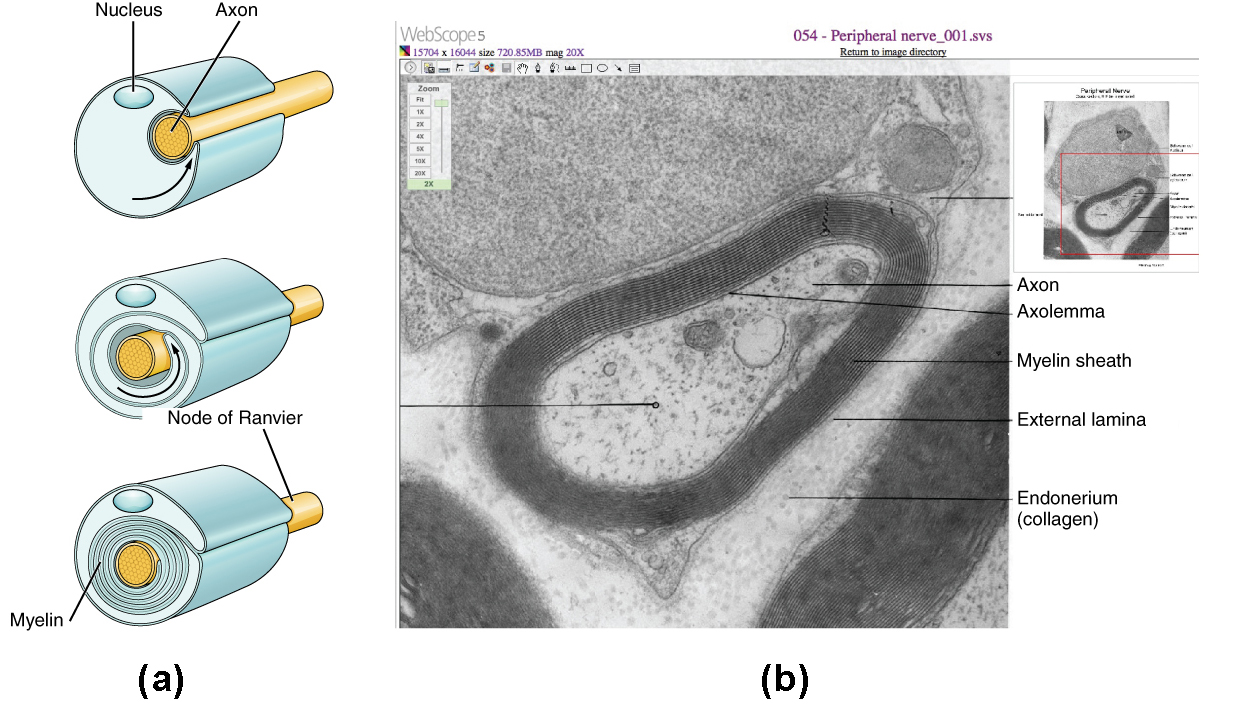
An animated diagram and histology slide of an axon, that shows the location of the axolemma relative to the axon.

== Composition ==
The skeletal framework of this structure is formed by hexagonal or pentagonal arrangement of spectrin on the inside of the cell membrane, as well as actin connected to the transmembrane. The metric cellular matrix is bound by transmembrane proteins, including the β1-integrin, to the cytoskeleton via the membrane skeleton. The axolemma is a phospholipid bilayer membrane, and charged ions/particles cannot directly pass through it. Instead, transmembrane proteins, such as specialized energy dependent ion pumps (the sodium/potassium pump), and ion channels (ligand-gated channels, mechanically gated channels, voltage-gated channels, and leakage channels) that sit within the axolemma are required to assist these charged ions/particles across the membrane, and to generate transmembrane potentials that will generate an action potential.

== Function ==
The primary responsibility of cell membranes, including those surrounding the axon, is to regulate what goes into the cell and what goes out of the cell. The axolemma plays an important role in the nervous system, specifically the sensation, integration, and response pathways within the nervous system. Communication between neurons within the nervous system relies on excitable membranes, especially the axolemma. The axolemma is responsible for relaying signals between the neuron and it's Schwann Cells. These signals control the proliferative and myelin-producing functions of the Schwann Cells, and also partly play a role in the regulation of the size of the axon.

== The axolemma's role in the generation of action potentials ==
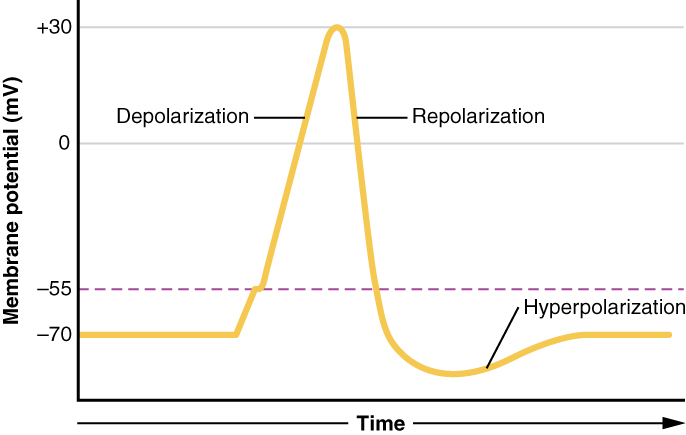
Graph showing the depolarization, repolarization, and hyperpolarization of an action potential.

Recent studies have shown that action potentials can originate not only from the axon hillock but also from the initial axonal segment, the axolemma, of the axonal region where it exhibits a dense granular layer similar to that found at the nodes of Ranvier. The variations in electrical state of the axolemma is referred to as the membrane potential – a potential being the distribution of charge between the inside and outside of the cell, which is measured in millivolts (mV). The transmembrane proteins keep the concentration of ions inside the cell and the concentration of ions outside the cell relatively balanced, with a net neutral charge, but if a difference in charge occurs right at the surface of the axolemma, either internally or externally, electrical signals, such as action potentials, can be generated.

When the cell, or axon, is at rest, the concentration of sodium (Na^{+}) outside of the cell is greater than the concentration of Na^{+} inside of the cell, and the concentration of potassium (K^{+}) inside of the cell is greater than the concentration of K^{+} outside of the cell. This difference in charge is referred to as the resting membrane potential – which is measured at -70mV.

The opening of channels within the axolemma, allows for Na^{+} to flow down its concentration gradient, and into the cell. Na^{+} is a positively charge ion, so the influx on Na^{+} causes the membrane potential to move toward zero. This is referred to as depolarization. However, the concentration gradient of Na^{+} is strong enough to allow Na^{+} to flow into the cell until the membrane potential to reach +30mV.

The membrane potential reaching +30 mV, and the concentration of Na^{+} being so high, causes other voltage-gated channels, that are specific to K^{+} to open. K^{+} then flows down its concentration gradient and out of the cell. Since the positively charged K^{+} is leaving the cell, the membrane potential goes back down toward its resting membrane potential. The movement of the membrane voltage back toward -70 mV is referred to as repolarization. However, repolarization overshoots the resting membrane potential, because the K^{+} channels experience a delay when closing, which causes a period of hyperpolarization.

This change in charge, voltage, and membrane potential generates an electrical signal referred to as an action potential. Action potentials are used for communication between neurons within nervous tissue.
