= Guidepost cells =

Cells that assist in the subcellular organization of both neural axon growth and migration

Guidepost cells are cells which assist in the subcellular organization of both neural axon growth and migration. They act as intermediate targets for long and complex axonal growths by creating short and easy pathways, leading axon growth cones towards their target area.

== Identification ==
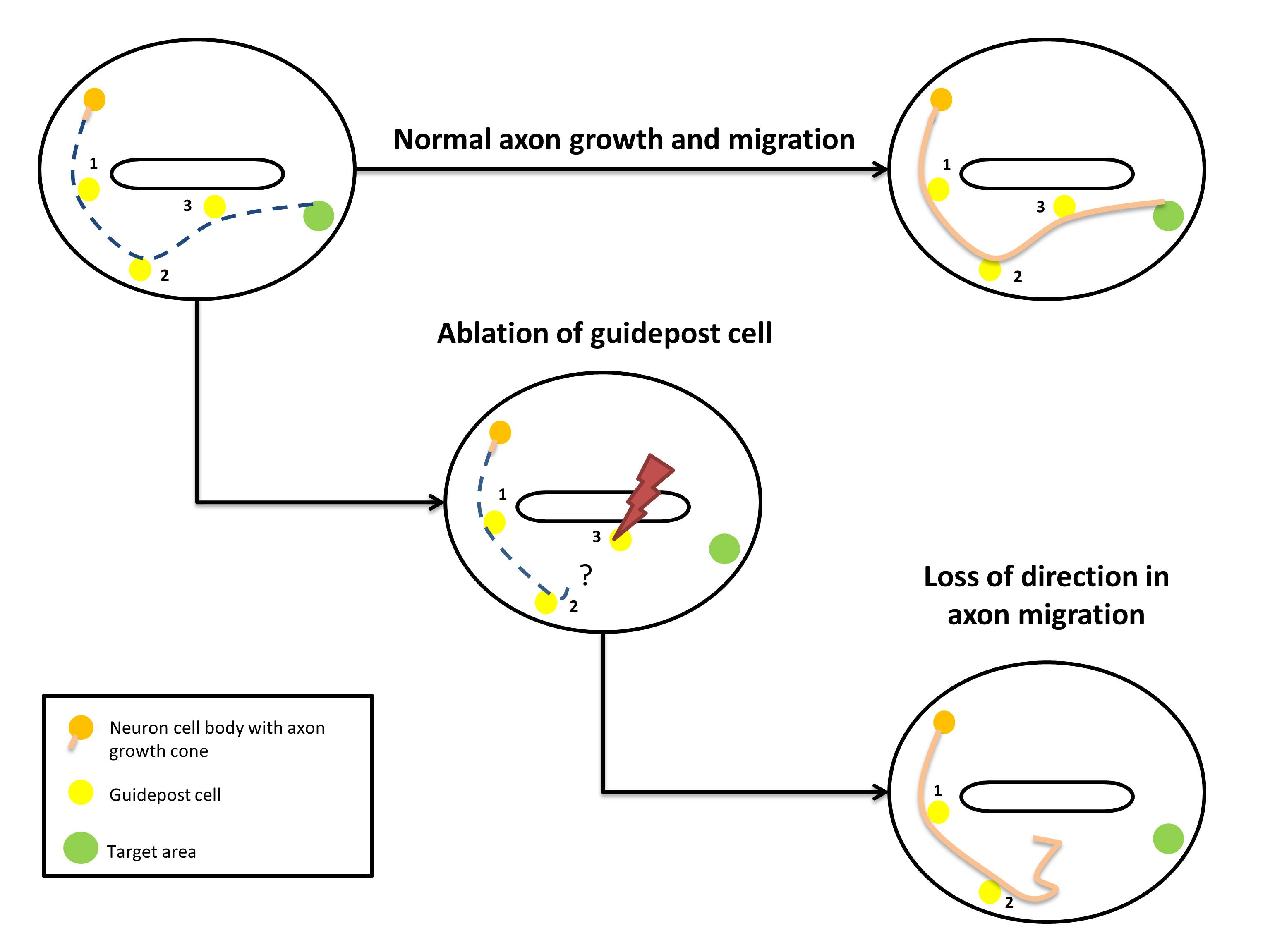
When a guidepost cell is destroyed, the primary growth cone loses its sense in direction and fails to reach its final destination.

In 1976, guideposts cells were identified in both grasshopper embryos and Drosophila. Single guidepost cells, acting like "stepping-stones" for the extension of Ti1 pioneer growth cones to the CNS, were first discovered in grasshopper limb bud. However, guidepost cells can also act as a group. There is a band of epithelial cells, called floor-plate cells, present in the neural tube of Drosophila available for the binding of growing axons. These studies have defined guidepost cells as non-continuous landmarks located on future paths of growing axons by providing high-affinity substrates to bind to for navigation.

Guidepost cells are typically immature glial cells or still axonless neurons. They can either be labeled as short range cells or axon dependent cells.

To qualify as a guidepost cell, neurons hypothesized to be influenced by a guidance cell are examined during development. To test the guidance cell in question, neural axon growth and migration is first examined in the presence of the guidance cell. Then, the guidance cell is destroyed to further examine neural axon growth and migration in the absence of the guidance cell. If the neuronal axon extends towards the path in the presence of the guidance cell and loses its path in the absence of the guidance cell, it is qualified as a guidepost cell. Ti1 pioneer neurons are a common example of neurons that require guidepost cells in order to reach their final destination. They have to come in contact with three guidepost neurons to reach the CNS: Fe1, Tr1, and Cx1. When Cx1 is destroyed, the Ti1 pioneer is unable to reach the CNS.

== Roles in formation ==
=== Lateral olfactory tract ===
The lateral olfactory tract (LOT) is the first system where guideposts cells were proposed to play a role in axonal guidance. In this migrational pathway, olfactory neurons move from the nasal cavities to the mitral cells in the olfactory bulb. The mitral primary axons extend and form a bundle of axons, called the LOT, towards higher olfactory centers: anterior olfactory nucleus, olfactory tubercle, piriform cortexr, entorhinal cortex, and cortical nuclei of the amygdala. "LOT cells", the first neurons to appear in the telencephalon, are considered to be guideposts because they have cellular substrates to attract LOX axons. To test their role in guidance, scientists ablated LOT cells with a toxin called 6-OHDA. As a result, LOT axons were stalled in the areas where LOT cells were destroyed, which confirmed lot cells as guidepost cells.

=== Entorhinal projections ===
Cajal-Retzius cells are the first cells to cover the cortical sheet and hippocampal primordium, and regulate cortical lamination by Reelin. In order to make connections with GABAergic neurons in different regions of the hippocampus (stratum oriens, stratum radiatum, and inner molecular layer), pioneer entorhinal neurons make synaptic contacts with Cajal-Retzius cells. To test their role in guidance, scientists (Del Rio and colleagues) ablated Cajal-Retzius cells with 6-OHDA. As a result, entorhinal axons did not grow in the hippocampus and ruled Cajal-Retzius cells as guidepost cells.

=== Thalamocortical connections ===
Perirecular cells (or internal capsule cells) are neuronal guidepost cells located along the path of creating the internal capsule. They provide a scaffold for corticothalamic and thalamocortical axons (TCAs) to send messages to the thalamus. There are transcription factors associated with perirecular cells: Mash1, Lhx2, and Emx2. When guidepost cells are mutated with knock out expressions of these factors, the guidance of TCAs are defected.

Corridor cells are another set of guidepost cells present for TCA guidance. These GABAergic neurons migrate to form a "corridor" between proliferation zones of the medial ganglionic eminence and globus pallidus. Corridor cells provide TCA growth through MGE-derived regions. However, the Neurgulin1 signaling pathway needs to be activated, with the expression of ErbB4 receptors on the surface of TCAs, for the connection to occur between corridor cells and TCAs.

=== Corpus callosum ===
There are subpopulations of glial cells that provide guidance cues for axonal growth. The first set of cells, called the "mid-line glial zipper", regulate the midline fusion and guidance of pioneer axons to the septum towards the contralateral hemisphere. The "glial sling" is a second set, located at the corticoseptal boundary, which provide cellular substrates for callosal axon migration across the dorsal midline. The "glial wedge" is made up of radial fibers, secreting repellent cues to prevent axons from entering the septum and positioning them towards the corpus callosum. The last set of glial cells, located in the induseum griseum, control the positioning of pioneer cingulate neurons in the corpus callosum region.

== See also ==
- Nerve fiber
- Nerve
- Neuron
- Dendrite
- Synapse
- Axon guidance
- Pioneer axon
- Electrophysiology
- Neural cell adhesion molecule
