= Internodal segment =

Portion of a nerve fiber

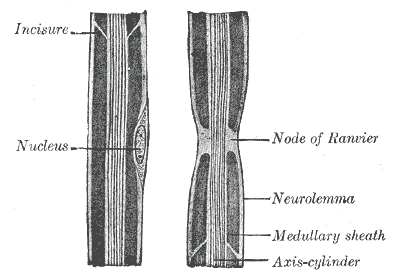
- Diagram of longitudinal sections of medullated nerve fibers.

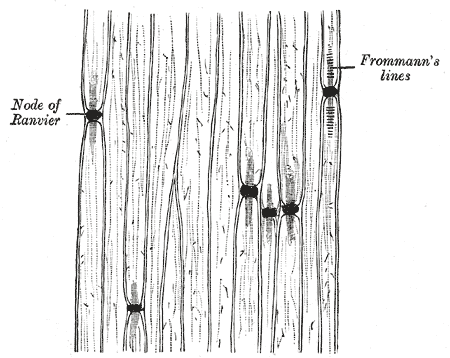
- Medullated nerve fibers stained with silver nitrate.

Details
- Part of: Axon of nerve fiber
- System: Nervous system

Identifiers
- Latin: segmentum internodale
- TH: H2.00.06.2.03028

In neuroscience, an internodal segment (or internode) is the portion of a nerve fiber between two nodes of Ranvier. The neurilemma or primitive sheath is not interrupted at the nodes, but passes over them as a continuous membrane.
