= Node of Ranvier =

Gaps between myelin sheaths on the axon of a neuron

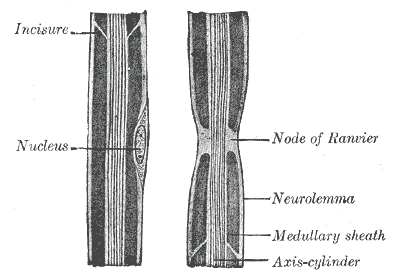
- Drawing of a peripheral nerve axon (labeled "axis cylinder"), showing a node of Ranvier along with other features

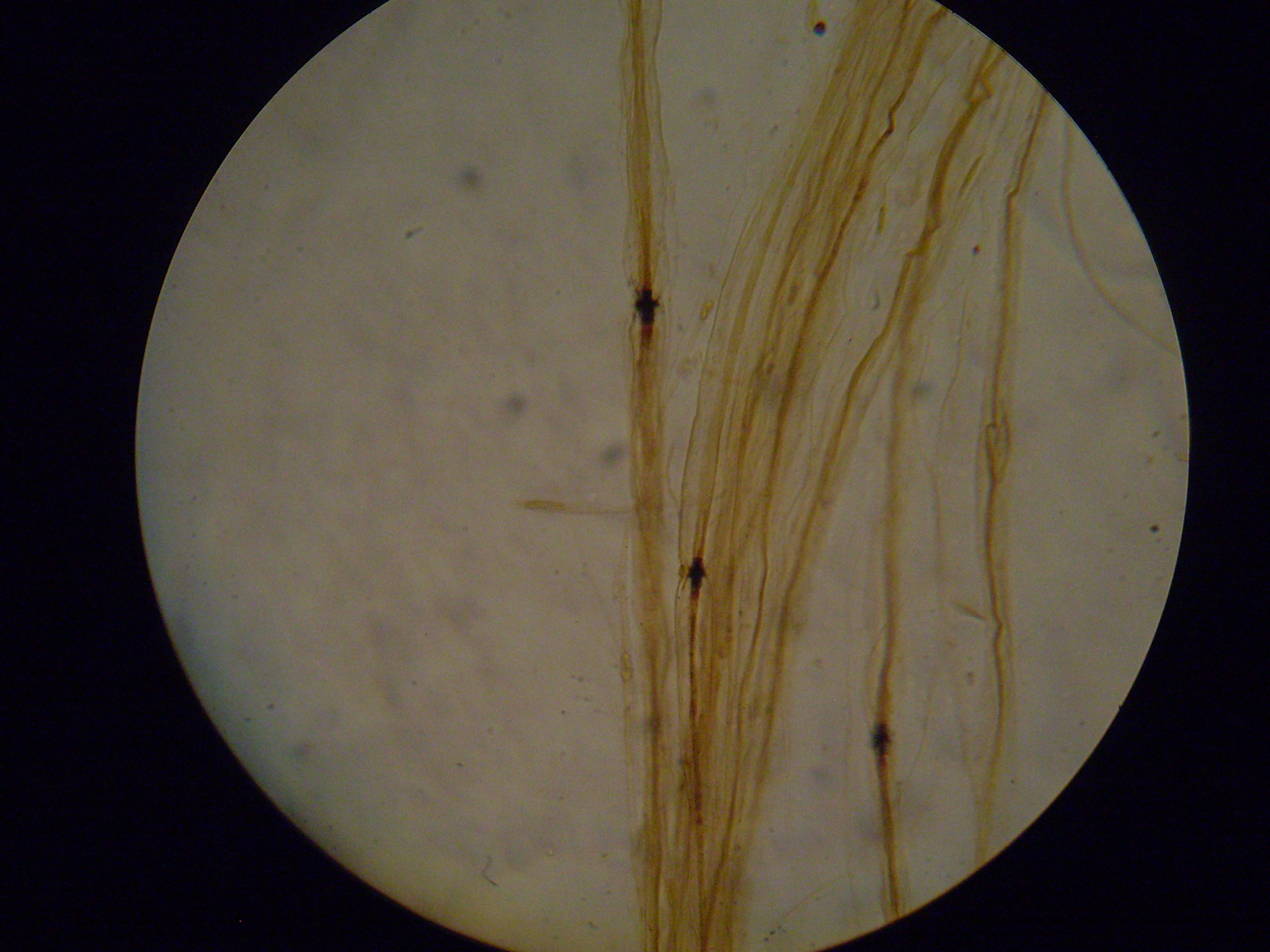
- Nodes of Ranvier

Details
- System: Nervous system
- Location: Myelinated axon of a nerve

Identifiers
- Latin: incisura myelini
- MeSH: D011901
- TH: H2.00.06.2.03015

Nodes of Ranvier (/ˈrɑːn.vi.eɪ/, RAHN-vee-ay), also known as myelin-sheath gaps, occur along a myelinated axon where the axolemma is exposed to the extracellular space. Nodes of Ranvier are uninsulated axonal domains that are high in sodium and potassium ion channels complexed with cell adhesion molecules, allowing them to participate in the exchange of ions required to regenerate the action potential. Nerve conduction in myelinated axons is referred to as saltatory conduction (from Latin saltus 'leap, jump') due to the manner in which the action potential seems to "jump" from one node to the next along the axon. This results in faster conduction of the action potential. The nodes of Ranvier are present in both the peripheral and central nervous systems.

== Overview ==
Node of Ranvier in the peripheral nervous system

The nodes are primarily composed of sodium and potassium voltage-gated ion channels; CAMs such as neurofascin-186 and NrCAM; and cytoskeletal adaptor proteins such as ankyrin-G and spectrinβIV. Many vertebrate axons are surrounded by a myelin sheath, allowing rapid and efficient saltatory ("jumping") propagation of action potentials. The contacts between neurons and glial cells display a very high level of spatial and temporal organization in myelinated fibers. The myelinating glial cells - oligodendrocytes in the central nervous system (CNS), and Schwann cells in the peripheral nervous system (PNS) - are wrapped around the axon, leaving the axolemma relatively uncovered at the regularly spaced nodes of Ranvier.

The internodal glial membranes are fused to form compact myelin, whereas the cytoplasm-filled paranodal loops of myelinating cells are spirally wrapped around the axon at both sides of the nodes. This organization demands a tight developmental control and the formation of a variety of specialized zones of contact between different areas of the myelinating cell membrane. Each node of Ranvier is flanked by paranodal regions where helicoidally wrapped glial loops are attached to the axonal membrane by a septate-like junction.

The segment between nodes of Ranvier is termed as the internode, and its outermost part that is in contact with paranodes is referred to as the juxtaparanodal region. The nodes are encapsulated by microvilli stemming from the outer aspect of the Schwann cell membrane in the PNS, or by perinodal extensions from astrocytes in the CNS.

== Structure ==
The internodes are the myelin segments and the gaps between are referred to as nodes. The size and the spacing of the internodes vary with the fiber diameter in a curvilinear relationship that is optimized for maximal conduction velocity. The size of the nodes span from 1–2 μm whereas the internodes can be up to (and occasionally even greater than) 1.5 millimetres long, depending on the axon diameter and fiber type.

The structure of the node and the flanking paranodal regions are distinct from the internodes under the compact myelin sheath, but are very similar in CNS and PNS. The axon is exposed to the extra-cellular environment at the node and is constricted in its diameter. The decreased axon size reflects a higher packing density of neurofilaments in this region, which are less heavily phosphorylated and are transported more slowly. Vesicles and other organelles are also increased at the nodes, which suggest that there is a bottleneck of axonal transport in both directions as well as local axonal-glial signaling.

When a longitudinal section is made through a myelinating Schwann cell at the node, three distinctive segments are represented: the stereotypic internode, the paranodal region, and the node itself. In the internodal region, the Schwann cell has an outer collar of cytoplasm, a compact myelin sheath, and inner collar of cytoplasm, and the axolemma. At the paranodal regions, the paranodal cytoplasm loops contact thickenings of the axolemma to form septate –like junctions. In the node alone, the axolemma is contacted by several Schwann microvilli and contains a dense cytoskeletal undercoating.

=== Differences in the central and peripheral nervous systems ===
Although freeze fracture studies have revealed that the nodal axolemma in both the CNS and PNS is enriched in intra-membranous particles (IMPs) compared to the internode, there are some structural differences reflecting their cellular constituents. In the PNS, specialized microvilli project from the outer collar of Schwann cells and come very close to nodal axolemma of large fibers. The projections of the Schwann cells are perpendicular to the node and are radiating from the central axons. However, in the CNS, one or more of the astrocytic processes come in close vicinity of the nodes. Researchers declare that these processes stem from multi-functional astrocytes, as opposed to from a population of astrocytes dedicated to contacting the node. On the other hand, in the PNS, the basal lamina that surrounds the Schwann cells is continuous across the node. A study suggests that in the CNS, nerve cells individually alter the size of the nodes to tune conduction speeds, leading node length to vary much more across different axons than within one.

=== Composition ===
The nodes of Ranvier Na^{+}/Ca^{2+} exchangers and high density of voltage-gated Na^{+} channels that generate action potentials. A sodium channel consists of a pore-forming α subunit and two accessory β subunits, which anchor the channel to extra-cellular and intra-cellular components. The nodes of Ranvier in the central and peripheral nervous systems mostly consist of αNaV1.6 and β1 subunits. The extra-cellular region of β subunits can associate with itself and other proteins, such as tenascin R and the cell-adhesion molecules neurofascin and contactin. Contactin is also present at nodes in the CNS and interaction with this molecule enhances the surface expression of Na^{+} channels.

Ankyrin has been found to be bounded to βIV spectrin, a spectrin isoform enriched at nodes of Ranvier and axon initial segments. The PNS nodes are surrounded by Schwann cell microvilli, which contain ERMs and EBP50 that may provide a connection to actin microfilaments. Several extracellular matrix proteins are enriched at nodes of Ranvier, including tenascin-R, Bral-1, and proteoglycan NG2, as well as phosphacan and versican V2. At CNS nodes, the axonal proteins also include contactin; however, different from the PNS, Schwann cell microvilli are replaced by astrocyte perinodal extensions.

=== Molecular organization ===
The molecular organization of the nodes corresponds to their specialized function in impulse propagation. The level of sodium channels in the node versus the internode suggests that the number IMPs corresponds to sodium channels. Potassium channels are essentially absent in the nodal axolemma, whereas they are highly concentrated in the paranodal axolemma and Schwann cell membranes at the node. The exact function of potassium channels have not quite been revealed, but it is known that they may contribute to the rapid repolarization of the action potentials or play a vital role in buffering the potassium ions at the nodes. This highly asymmetric distribution of voltage-gated sodium and potassium channels is in striking contrast to their diffuse distribution in unmyelinated fibers.

The filamentous network subjacent to the nodal membrane contains cytoskeletal proteins called spectrin and ankyrin. The high density of ankyrin at the nodes may be functionally significant because several of the proteins that are populated at the nodes share the ability to bind to ankyrin with extremely high affinity. All of these proteins, including ankyrin, are enriched in the initial segment of axons which suggests a functional relationship. Now the relationship of these molecular components to the clustering of sodium channels at the nodes is still not known. Although some cell-adhesion molecules have been reported to be present at the nodes inconsistently; however, a variety of other molecules are known to be highly populated at the glial membranes of the paranodal regions where they contribute to its organization and structural integrity.

== Development ==
=== Myelination of nerve fibers ===
The complex changes that the Schwann cell undergoes during the process of myelination of peripheral nerve fibers have been observed and studied by many. The initial envelopment of the axon occurs without interruption along the entire extent of the Schwann cell. This process is sequenced by the in-folding of the Schwann cell surface so that a double membrane of the opposing faces of the in-folded Schwann cell surface is formed. This membrane stretches and spirally wraps itself over and over as the in-folding of the Schwann cell surface continues. As a result, the increase in the thickness of the extension of the myelin sheath in its cross-sectional diameter is easily ascertained. It is also evident that each of the consecutive turns of the spiral increases in size along the length of the axon as the number of turns increase. However, it is not clear whether or not the increase in length of the myelin sheath can be accounted solely by the increase in length of axon covered by each successive turn of the spiral, as previously explained. At the junction of two Schwann cells along an axon, the directions of the lamellar overhang of the myelin endings are of opposite sense. This junction, adjacent of the Schwann cells, constitutes the region designated as the node of Ranvier.

=== Early stages ===
Researchers prove that in the developing CNS, Nav1.2 is initially expressed at all forming nodes of Ranvier. Upon maturation, nodal Nav1.2 is down-regulated and replaced by Nav1.6. Nav1.2 is also expressed during PNS node formation, which suggests that the switching of Nav-channel subtypes is a general phenomenon in the CNS and PNS. In this same investigation, it was shown that Nav1.6 and Nav1.2 colocalize at many nodes of Ranvier during early myelination. This also led to the suggestion that early clusters of Nav1.2 and Nav1.6 channels are destined to later become nodes of Ranvier. Neurofascin is also reported to be one of the first proteins to accumulate at newly forming nodes of Ranvier. They are also found to provide the nucleation site for attachment of ankyrin G, Nav channels, and other proteins. The recent identification of the Schwann cell microvilli protein gliomedin as the likely binding partner of axonal neurofascin brings forward substantial evidence for the importance of this protein in recruiting Nav channels to the nodes of Ranvier. Furthermore, Lambert et al. and Eshed et al. also indicates that neurofascin accumulates before Nav channels and is likely to have crucial roles in the earliest events associated with node of Ranvier formation. Thus, multiple mechanisms may exist and work synergistically to facilitate clustering of Nav channels at nodes of Ranvier.

=== Nodal formation ===
The first event appears to be the accumulation of cell adhesion molecules such as NF186 or NrCAM. The intra-cellular regions of these cell-adhesion molecules interact with ankyrin G, which serves as an anchor for sodium channels. In the PNS, this interaction has been elucidated. The Ig superfamily membrane protein NrCAM acts as a pioneer molecule in the formation of the nodes by recruiting ankyrin-G, a mediator protein in the connection of actin-spectrin cytoskeleton to the ion gated channels present at the node. At the same time, the periaxonal extension of the glial cell wraps around the axon, giving rise to the paranodal regions. This movement along the axon contributes significantly to the overall formation of the nodes of Ranvier by permitting heminodes formed at the edges of neighboring glial cells to fuse into complete nodes. Septate-like junctions form at the paranodes with the enrichment of NF155 in glial paranodal loops.

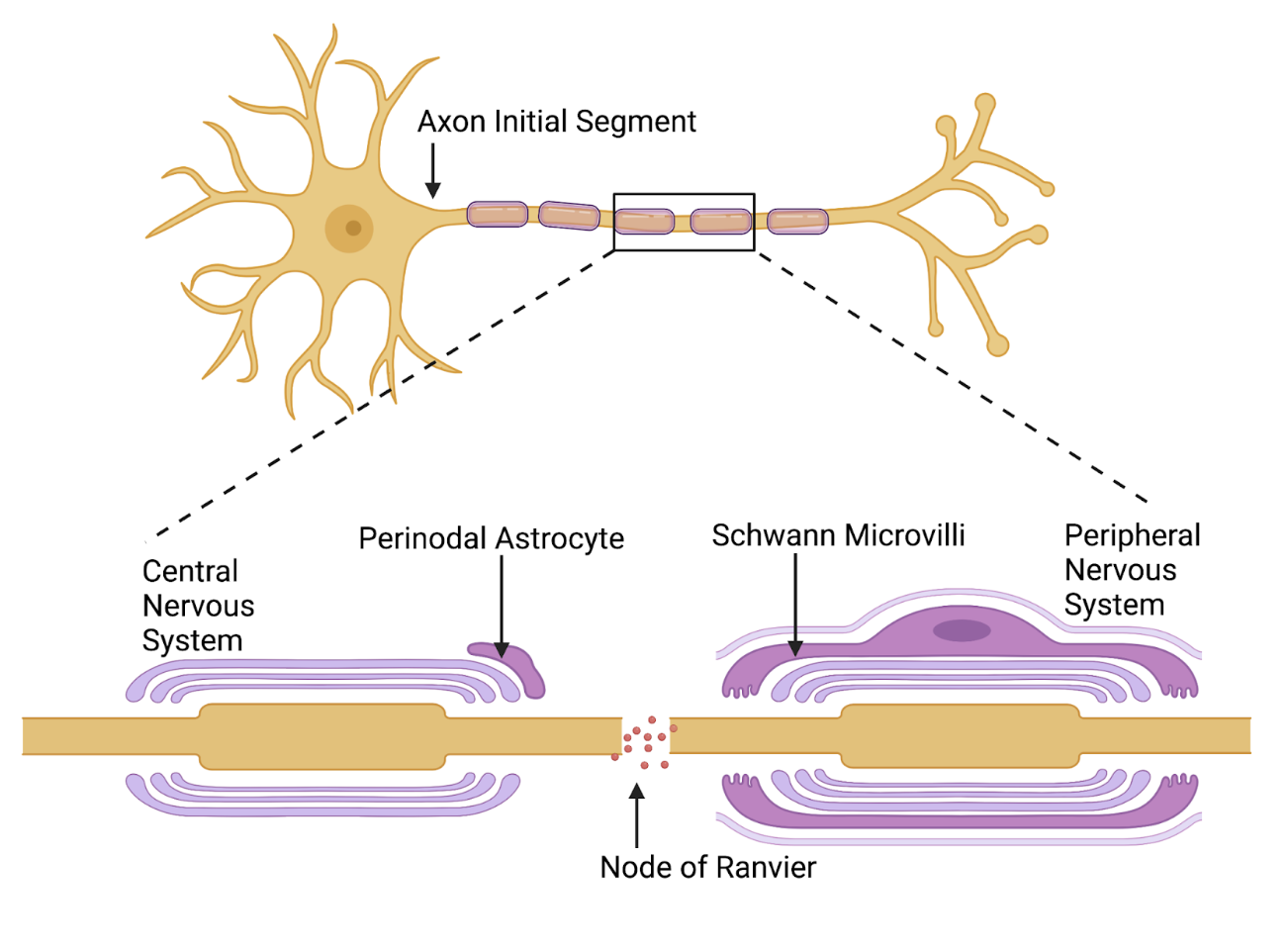
Nodes of Ranvier in the Central and Peripheral Nervous Systems

Immediately following the early differentiation of the nodal and paranodal regions, potassium channels, Caspr2 and TAG1 accumulate in the juxta-paranodal regions. This accumulation coincides directly with the formation of compact myelin. In mature nodal regions, interactions with the intracellular proteins appear vital for the stability of all nodal regions. In the CNS, oligodendrocytes do not possess microvilli, but appear capable to initiate the clustering of some axonal proteins through secreted factors. The combined effects of such factors with the subsequent movements generated by the wrapping of oligodendrocyte periaxonal extension could account for the organization of CNS nodes of Ranvier.

== Function ==
=== Action potential ===
An action potential is a spike of both positive and negative ionic discharge that travels along the membrane of a cell. The creation and conduction of action potentials represents a fundamental means of communication in the nervous system. Action potentials represent rapid reversals in voltage across the plasma membrane of axons. These rapid reversals are mediated by voltage-gated ion channels found in the plasma membrane. The action potential travels from one location in the cell to another, but ion flow across the membrane occurs only at the nodes of Ranvier. As a result, the action potential signal jumps along the axon, from node to node, rather than propagating smoothly, as they do in axons that lack a myelin sheath. The clustering of voltage-gated sodium and potassium ion channels at the nodes permits this behavior.

=== Saltatory conduction ===
Since an axon can be unmyelinated or myelinated, the action potential has two methods to travel down the axon. These methods are referred to as continuous conduction for unmyelinated axons, and saltatory conduction for myelinated axons. Saltatory conduction is defined as an action potential moving in discrete jumps down a myelinated axon.

This process is outlined as the charge passively spreading to the next node of Ranvier to depolarize it to threshold which will then trigger an action potential in this region which will then passively spread to the next node and so on.

Saltatory conduction provides one advantage over conduction that occurs along an axon without myelin sheaths. This is that the increased speed afforded by this mode of conduction assures faster interaction between neurons. On the other hand, depending on the average firing rate of the neuron, calculations show that the energetic cost of maintaining the resting potential of oligodendrocytes can outweigh the energy savings of action potentials. So, axon myelination does not necessarily save energy.

== Formation regulation ==
=== Paranode regulation via mitochondria accumulation ===
Mitochondria and other membranous organelles are normally enriched in the PNP region of peripheral myelinated axons, especially those large caliber axons. The actual physiological role of this accumulation and factors that regulate it are not understood; however, it is known that mitochondria are usually present in areas of the cell that expresses a high energy demand. In these same regions, they are also understood to contain growth cones, synaptic terminals, and sites of action potential initiation and regeneration, such as the nodes of Ranvier. In the synaptic terminals, mitochondria produce the ATP needed to mobilize vesicles for neurotransmission. In the nodes of Ranvier, mitochondria serve as an important role in impulse conduction by producing the ATP that is essential to maintain the activity of energy-demanding ion pumps. Supporting this fact, about five times more mitochondria are present in the PNP axoplasm of large peripheral axons than in the corresponding internodal regions of these fibers.

=== Nodal regulation ===
==== Via αII-Spectrin ====
Saltatory conduction in myelinated axons requires organization of the nodes of Ranvier, whereas voltage-gated sodium channels are highly populated. Studies show that αII-Spectrin, a component of the cytoskeleton is enriched at the nodes and paranodes at early stages and as the nodes mature, the expression of this molecule disappears. It is also proven that αII-Spectrin in the axonal cytoskeleton is absolutely vital for stabilizing sodium channel clusters and organizing the mature node of Ranvier.

==== Possible regulation via the recognition molecule OMgp ====
It has been shown previously that OMgp (oligodendrocyte myelin glycoprotein) clusters at nodes of Ranvier and may regulate paranodal architecture, node length and axonal sprouting at nodes. However, a follow-up study showed that the antibody used previously to identify OMgp at nodes crossreacts with another node-enriched component versican V2 and that OMgp is not required for the integrity of nodes and paranodes, arguing against the previously reported localization and proposed functions of OMgp at nodes.

== Clinical significance ==
The proteins in these excitable domains of neuron when injured may result in cognitive disorders and various neuropathic ailments.

== History ==
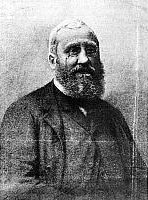
Louis Antoine Ranvier (1835–1922)

The myelin sheath of long nerves was discovered and named by German pathological anatomist Rudolf Virchow in 1854. French pathologist and anatomist Louis-Antoine Ranvier later discovered the nodes, or gaps, in the myelin sheath that now bear his name. Born in Lyon, Ranvier was one of the most prominent histologists of the late 19th century. Ranvier abandoned pathological studies in 1867 and became an assistant of physiologist Claude Bernard. He was the chairman of General Anatomy at the Collège de France in 1875.

Ranvier discovered the nodes in 1878. Using staining techniques developed by Ludwig Mauthner, he noticed that myelinated axons were only stained at regular intervals, leading to the discovery of the nodes. Reportedly, he dismissed the idea of nodes in the CNS although their existence was proven later.

His refined histological techniques and his work on both injured and normal nerve fibers became world-renowned. His observations on fiber nodes and the degeneration and regeneration of cut fibers had a great influence on Parisian neurology at the Salpêtrière. Soon afterwards, he discovered gaps in sheaths of nerve fibers, which were later called the Nodes of Ranvier. This discovery later led Ranvier to careful histological examination of myelin sheaths and Schwann cells.

== Additional images ==
Complete neuron cell diagram

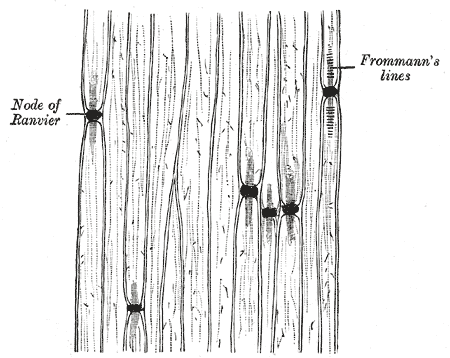
Medullated nerve fibers stained with silver nitrate

== See also ==
- Internodal segment
- Schwann cell
- Oligodendrocyte
- Myelin
