= Pioneer axon =

Pioneer axon is the classification given to axons that are the first to grow in a particular region. They originate from pioneer neurons, and have the main function of laying down the initial growing path that subsequent growing axons, dubbed follower axons, from other neurons will eventually follow.

Several theories relating to the structure and function of pioneer axons are currently being explored. The first theory is that pioneer axons are specialized structures, and that they play a crucial role in guiding follower axons. The second is that pioneer axons are no different from follower axons, and that they play no role in guiding follower axons.

Anatomically, there are no differences between pioneer and follower axons, although there are morphological differences. The mechanisms of pioneer axons and their role in axon guidance is currently being explored. In addition, many studies are being conducted in model organisms, such grasshoppers, zebrafish, and fruit flies to study the effects of manipulations of pioneer axons on neuronal development.

== History ==
Santiago Ramon y Cajal, considered the father of modern neuroscience, was one of the first to physically observe growing axons. Moreover, he observed that axons grew in a structured, guided manner. He advocated that axons were guided by chemotactic cues. Indeed, later experiments showed that in both invertebrate and vertebrate models, axons grew along pre-determined routes to create a reproducible scaffold of nerves.

Ramon y Cajal's views faced some competition from those of Paul Alfred Weiss, his contemporary neuroscientist during the 1920s and 1930s. Weiss argued that functional specificity did not depend on specific axon connections, and that nonspecific mechanical cues participated in guiding axons. Subsequent investigations into chemotactics cues that started in the 1970s eventually proved that Ramon y Cajal's initial ideas were intuitive and ahead of his time.

== Mechanisms of growth ==
The mechanism of growth of pioneer neurons has been investigated in the central and peripheral nervous systems of invertebrate animals. Observations of axon growth during the early embryonic period have led to conclusions that axons are actively guided to specific locations. Within these animal models, several factors have been identified as playing a role in determining the direction of growth.

Guidepost cells are specialized early differentiating sensory cells. These cells are essential in providing navigational information to pioneer axons. Arrays of pioneer neurons create short segments of pioneer axons extending distal to proximal within an appendage. The resulting trajectories are due to pioneer axons growing from guidepost to guidepost cells. In addition, pioneer axons can act as guidepost cells to more distant pioneer neurons. Studies that involved selective destruction of guidepost cells resulted in pioneer axons becoming unable to navigate normally to the CNS from the PNS. Instead, the pioneer axons assumed alternate configurations and followed different trajectories. In addition, without the guidepost cells, the pioneer axons did not find the stereotyped route that pioneer axons would normally navigate.

It has been shown that glial cells also play a role in axon guidance in various ways. In particular, glial cells demonstrate an interaction with the growth cones of pioneer axons. The route of extending growth cones has been shown to be abundant in glial cells, which are in turn part of a cellular mesh including other intermediate neurons and filopodia. Glial cells also participate in the fasciculation and defasciculation of axons, which are essential in shaping the pathways that are eventually followed. A proposed mechanism involves the creation of a scaffold made out of interface glia, which growth cones contact during the establishment of axon tracts. Ablation of the interface glia leads to a complete loss of longitudinal pioneer axon tracts. In addition, ablation of glia in later embryonic development also interfered with guidance of follower axons, showing that glial cells are necessary in maintaining scaffold needed for contacting growth cones.

== Chemotactic influences ==
A variety of chemotactic cues provide essential signaling directing the directional growth of pioneer axons. Chemotactic cues are unique in that they can be multifunctional and versatile. A single chemotactic cue can both act as an attractant or repellent to pioneer axons, and may work from either a distance or within the immediate vicinity. More specifically, the interactions between chemotactic cues and growth cones can offer a possible explanation for the diversity that is observed in their behavior. Guidance molecules are heavily involved in steering the directions of growth cones. For example, guidance molecules can initiate, extend, stabilize, or retract individual filopodia, as well as attract various adhesion molecules to impact their physical state.

Some of the various chemotactic cues that have been explored in the mechanisms of pioneer axons include netrin, ephrin, semaphorin, Slit-Robo, and Notch. Receptors for these molecules have also been studied. Netrins primarily function as attractions of pioneer axons towards the midline. They can act from a distance as much as a few millimeters, as well as act in short range. Netrins can also act as a repellant. Unique among chemoattractants is that the function of netrin has been conserved among a variety of species across 600 million years. Like netrin, ephrin can function as both an attractant and repellant. Ephrins primarily play a role in setting a gradient along the anterior-posterior axis for the guidance of developing retinal axons. Semaphorins, which were first identified on specific axons in the grasshopper CNS, function primarily as short-range inhibitory cues that steer pioneer axons away from less ideal regions. Receptor complexes for semaphorins include neuropilins and plexins.

The Slit-Robo cell signaling pathway plays an important role in guiding pioneer axons, especially pioneer longitudinal axons. These axons, which function to connect major parts of the CNS, are mainly present during embryonic development. The Slit family mainly functions as a repellent towards longitudinal axons, guiding them away from the ventral midline. The loss of Slit in Drosophila caused the presence of longitudinal axons in the midline. In conjunction with the Robo receptor, Slit signaling played a role in determining tract positions parallel to the midline for longitudinal axons to follow during development. The loss of either Slit or Robo caused dysfunction in the development of longitudinal pioneer neurons in the midbrain and hindbrain of Drosophila. Furthermore, it has been shown that Robo plays a diversified role in pioneer axon guidance in different areas of the brain during embryonic development. Primarily, Robo 1 is crucial towards pioneer longitudinal axon guidance in the ventral tract, while Robo 2 is important in the dorsal tract.

The signaling associated with the receptor Notch, as well as non-canonical Notch/Abl signaling, have been shown to play a role in the development of longitudinal pioneer neurons in the Drosophila ventral nerve cord. The Notch receptor has been shown to interact with interface glia to form a path that longitudinal pioneer neurons can follow. Notch/Abl signaling in the pioneer neurons increases the motility of the growth cones of longitudinal pioneer axons while stimulating filopodia development. It has also been noted that Notch signaling is also important in the migration of neurons in the mammalian cortex.

== Anatomy ==
The directed growth of axons depends on structure at the end of the tip of a growing axon referred to as a growth cone. Growth cones, in brief, are motile structures that explore the environment and ultimately guide the extension of the axon. The response of growth cones to various signaling molecules dictates the correct pathway and direction of growth of the axon. Growth cones possess a sheetlike expansion at the tip called the lamellipodium, from which extend fine processes called filopodia. The growth cone is necessary for the construction of neural pathways.

Although pioneer axons and follower axons both possess growth cones, there are several morphological differences related to the function of pioneer axons. The structure of the growth cone changes whenever an axon reaches a territory not previously innervated, or if a choice in direction is required. Mainly, the lamellipodium increase in size and extend numerous filopodia in order to collect as much sensory information as possible.

== Role in neuronal development ==
The role of pioneer axons in neuronal development has been studied extensively in various invertebrate and vertebrate systems in both the central nervous system and peripheral nervous system. Although these experiments have shed light on the functions of the pioneer axons, the results reveal conflicting information into the extent of the effect of pioneer axons on proper development. In addition, other studies have shown that certain cells that interact with pioneer axons are also crucial in the eventual development of neural pathways, and that loss of these cells results in improper navigation of pioneer axons. Furthermore, identical pathways and homologous neurons across different species reflect different pathfinding abilities of growth cones in pioneer neurons.

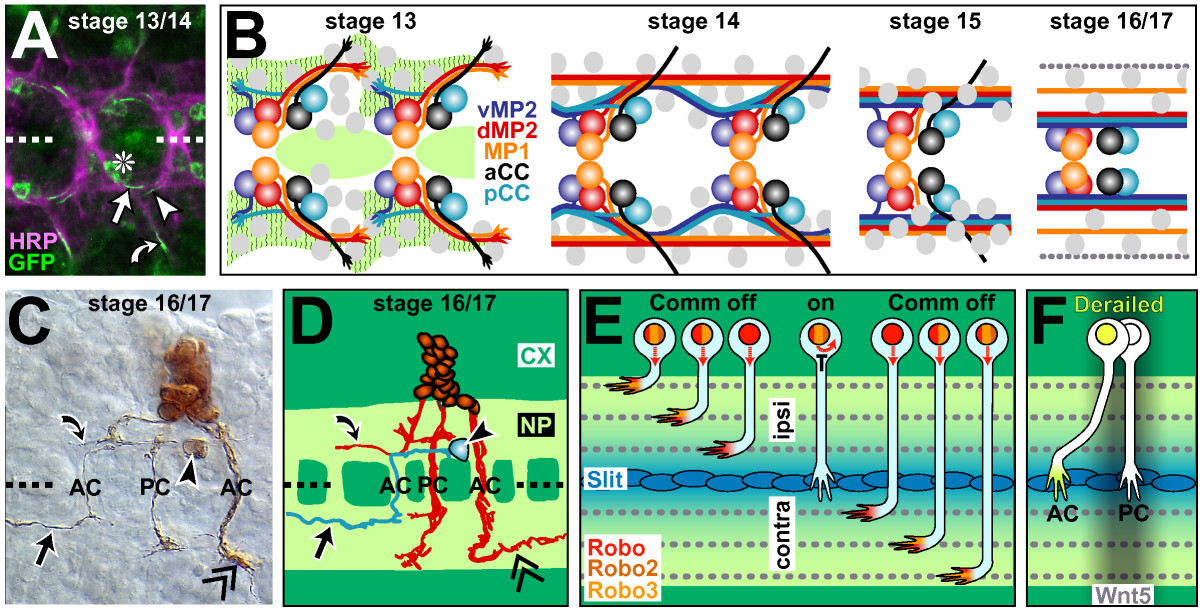
Axonal pathfinding and fasciculation behaviour in the embryonic ventral nerve cord of Drosophila.

An investigation was conducted looking into the role of pioneer axons in the formation of both CNS and PNS axon pathways in a Drosophila embryo. Using a method to ablate specific neurons, the ablation of the aCC axon, which plays a role in pioneering the intersegmental nerve in the Drosophila PNS, resulted in the three typical follower axons becoming delayed and prone to pathfinding errors. Despite these consequences, eventually the pathway was formed in the majority of subjects. Ablation of the pioneer axons that formed the longitudinal tracts in the Drosophila CNS resulted in similar difficulties in the formation and organization of longitudinal pathways in 70% of observed segments. Ultimately, like in the PNS, the longitudinal pathways formed in about 80% of observed segments. Thus, it was shown that the pioneer axons played a role in the development of the CNS and PNS, and without the pioneer axons, the growth of the followers was delayed. Remarkably, the majority of the tracts formed, indicating that other factors play a role in axon guidance that can correct for the loss of pioneer neurons.

Although studies of the mechanisms of pioneer axons have mostly been in invertebrate models, studies have also begun exploring the role of pioneer axons in the development of large vertebrate axon tracts. The primary model for these experiments has been in the zebrafish. Like in Drosophila, there is evidence to show that although pioneer axons play an important role in guiding the growth cones of follower axons, they may not be completely essential. The brain of the early zebrafish presents an ideal environment in which to study the behavior of developing axon tracts. The earliest differentiating pioneer neurons create a scaffold, with which growth cones of follower axons interact with.

Deletion of pioneer axons which create the scaffold have an effect on the growth cones of the neurons of the nucleus of the posterior commissure, in that they cannot follow the normal path of extending ventrally, then posteriorly. Despite the compromised pioneer neuron scaffold, the follower growth cones extend ventrally normally. However, around half of the followers do not follow the posterior longitudinal path correctly, while the other half do. This suggests that other cues other than those from pioneer axons play a role in guiding follower axon growth, and that pioneer axons may play different roles in different parts of neuronal development. In a different study, replacement or removal of the early-born retinal ganglion cells, which function as pioneer neurons, had a significantly deleterious effect on the ability of later axons to exit the eye. Subsequent axon-axon interactions were also shown to be necessary, as misrouting of retinal axons led to chiasm defasciculaiton, telencephalic and ventral hindbrain projections, or aberrant crossing in the posterior commissure.

== See also ==
- Axon guidance
- Pioneer neuron
