= ST8SIA1 =

Protein-coding gene in the species Homo sapiens

Identifiers
- Aliases: ST8SIA1, GD3S, SIAT8, SIAT8-A, SIAT8A, ST8SiaI, ST8 alpha-N-acetyl-neuraminide alpha-2,8-sialyltransferase 1
- External IDs: OMIM: 601123; MGI: 106011; GeneCards: ST8SIA1
Enzyme activity
EC #	BRENDA	ExPASy	KEGG	MetaCyc
2.4.3.8	↗	↗	↗	↗

Gene location (Human)
Chr.	Chromosome 12 (human)
Band	12p12.1	Start	22,063,773 bp
Band	12p12.1	End	22,437,041 bp

Gene location (Mouse)
Chr.	Chromosome 6 (mouse)
Band	6 G3|6 74.78 cM	Start	142,767,271 bp
Band	6 G3|6 74.78 cM	End	142,910,178 bp
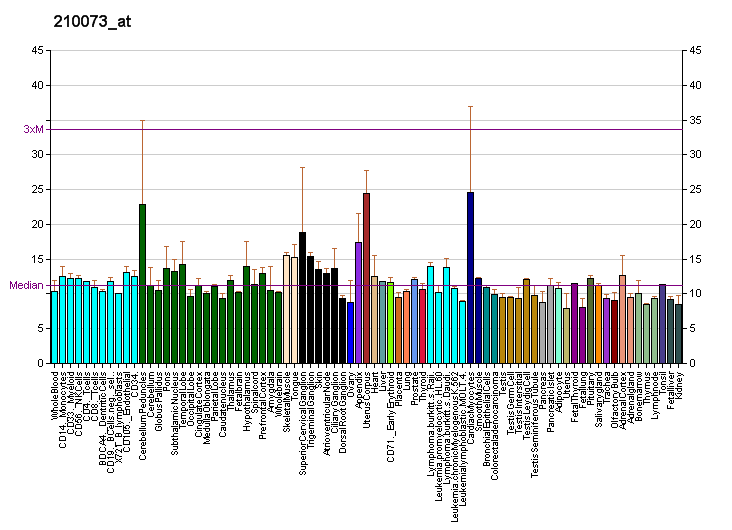
RNA expression pattern
Bgee	Human / Mouse (ortholog); Top expressed in: ventricular zone; ganglionic eminence; Achilles tendon; right hemisphere of cerebellum; gonad; muscle layer of sigmoid colon; prefrontal cortex; right adrenal cortex; C1 segment; testicle / Top expressed in: molar; facial motor nucleus; medial vestibular nucleus; anterior horn of spinal cord; deep cerebellar nuclei; pontine nuclei; dorsal tegmental nucleus; substantia nigra; proximal tubule; habenula; More reference expression data
BioGPS	More reference expression data
Gene ontology
Molecular function	transferase activity; sialyltransferase activity; glycosyltransferase activity; alpha-N-acetylneuraminate alpha-2,8-sialyltransferase activity
Cellular component	integral component of membrane; Golgi membrane; Golgi apparatus; membrane
Biological process	glycosphingolipid biosynthetic process; sialylation; protein glycosylation; cellular response to heat; positive regulation of cell population proliferation; sphingolipid metabolic process; lipid metabolism; carbohydrate metabolic process
Sources:Amigo / QuickGO
Orthologs
Databases	NCBI: entry; OMA: entry
Species	Human	Mouse
Entrez	6489	20449
Ensembl	ENSG00000111728	ENSMUSG00000030283
UniProt	Q92185	Q64687
RefSeq (mRNA)	NM_001304450; NM_003034	NM_011374
RefSeq (protein)	NP_001291379; NP_003025	NP_035504
Location (UCSC)	Chr 12: 22.06 – 22.44 Mb	Chr 6: 142.77 – 142.91 Mb
PubMed search
- Wikidata
View/Edit Human	View/Edit Mouse

Alpha-N-acetylneuraminide alpha-2,8-sialyltransferase is an enzyme that in humans is encoded by the ST8SIA1 gene.

Gangliosides are membrane-bound glycosphingolipids containing sialic acid. Ganglioside GD3 is known to be important for cell adhesion and growth of cultured malignant cells. The protein encoded by ST8SIA1 is a type II membrane protein that catalyzes the transfer of sialic acid from CMP-sialic acid to GM3 to produce gangliosides GD3 and GT3. The encoded protein may be found in the Golgi apparatus and is a member of glycosyltransferase family 29.

In melanocytic cells, ST8SIA1 gene expression may be regulated by MITF.
