= Perisynaptic schwann cells =

Perisynaptic schwann cells (also known as Terminal schwann cells or Teloglia) are neuroglia found at the Neuromuscular junction (NMJ) with known functions in synaptic transmission, synaptogenesis, and nerve regeneration. These cells share a common ancestor with both Myelinating and Non-Myelinating Schwann Cells called Neural Crest cells. Perisynaptic Schwann Cells (PSCs) contribute to the tripartite synapse organization in combination with the pre-synaptic nerve and the post-synaptic muscle fiber. PSCs are considered to be the glial component of the Neuromuscular Junction (NMJ) and have a similar functionality to that of Astrocytes in the Central Nervous System. The characteristics of PSCs are based on both external synaptic properties and internal glial properties, where the internal characteristics of PSCs develop based on the associated synapse, for example: the PSCs of a fast-twitch muscle fiber differ from the PSCs of a slow-twitch muscle fiber even when removed from their natural synaptic environment. PSCs of fast-twitch muscle fibers have higher Calcium levels in response to synapse innervation when compared to slow-twitch PSCs. This balance between external and internal influences creates a range of PSCs that are present in the many Neuromuscular Junctions of the Peripheral Nervous System.

== Discovery ==
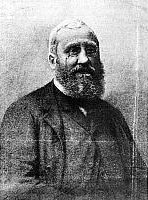
Louis-Antoine Ranvier

Perisynaptic (Terminal) Schwann Cells were first discovered by Louis-Antoine Ranvier in 1878 when he observed branching networks surrounding the motor end plate (neural portion of NMJ). He described PSCs as "arborisation nuclei" due to their many projections into the synapse seen under the microscope. These cells were distinguished from muscle fibre nuclei and the motor end plate, making the third component of the tripartite synaptic model. It was found that these newly discovered cells were present in nerve degeneration models, showing their non-neural nature. The proximity of PSCs to the motor end plate raised questions about their functionality, but little was known up until the vast research conducted in the past two decades.

== Development ==
The origin of Perisynaptic (Terminal) Schwann Cells was largely under question in the 1960s as there were arguments on whether the cells were of epithelial or glial descent, but the development of PSCs has been linked to Neural crest origin. As described above, PSCs are a type of non-myelinating Schwann cell, which develop from neural crest cells. The general series of developmental events can be summarized as this: Neural Crest cells develop into Schwann cell precursors which further develop into Immature Schwann cells which then differentiate into Myelinating Schwann cells and non-Myelinating schwann cells of which Perisynaptic Schwann cells are a subset.

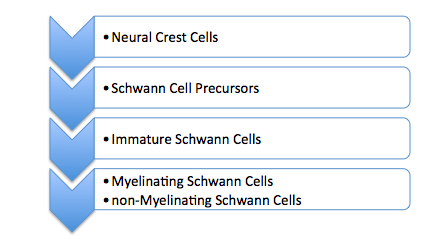
This is a flowchart of the development of Schwann cells from neural crest cells

Neural crest cells are found in the dorsal neural tube from which nerves and glia alike grow and Neural crest cells are the precursors to many various tissue types including enteric neurons and glia. Schwann cell precursors (a first derivative of Neural crest cells) are present as the nerve axon grows from the dorsal neural tube, but it has been shown that these glial precursors are not essential to axonal growth. The transition from neural crest cells to Schwann cell precursors is characterized by Sox10 and generally occurs around embryonic day 12-13 in rats. Schwann cell precursors then differentiate into Immature Schwann cells from which myelinating and non-myelinating Schwann cells are directly descended. These cells generally appear around embryonic day 13-15 in rats. The differentation of Immature Schwann cells occurs after birth and is dependent on the axons in which the glia are associated. This differentation is known to be reversible, as seen in regeneration models. Perisynaptic Schwann cells develop as non-myelinating Schwann cells and encapsulate the NMJ. PSCs can be attributed to glial lineage by the presence of Calcium binding proteins S100, Glial fibrillary acidic protein (GFAP), and Protein 0. These proteins are seen in other glial cells such as Myelinating Schwann cells and Neural Crest cells. While the lineage of non-Myelinating Schwann cells is known from neural crest cells, the exact development of PSCs from non-Myelinating Schwann cells is not fully understood.

== Roles at the neuromuscular junction (NMJ) ==
=== Synaptogenesis ===
Synaptogenesis is the formation of a synapse and in this case the Neuromuscular Junction is of interest. In this section, the focus is on the development of the NMJ from the outgrowth of axons during development. As mentioned in the development section, Schwann cell precursors accompany growing axons as they reach their associated muscles. It is now known that these PSC precursors are not essential to axonal growth, but when present they guide growth cones and help with the maintenance of NMJs after they are formed. After the initial nervous-muscle interface is formed, there is a striking growth in the number of PSCs at each newly developed NMJ. If, however, there is a lack of PSCs (for example in an ablated model) once the NMJ is formed, there is a lack of further axonal growth or even a retraction of axons can be observed. This is seen in a study on frog NMJs 8 and 12 days after ablation where there was a 44% retraction rate by the 12th day with no PSCs. This retraction shows that PSCs are not essential for the growth of axons, but are essential for the long-term maintenance of NMJs.

Cultures have been developed that simulate the functions of PSCs using various cell-derived factors in vitro. These cultures are used to understand the molecular basis for which PSCs promote synaptogenesis. From these cultures it has been found that TGF-ß1 (transforming growth factor-ß1) is essential for the development of synapses in vitro. This TGF-ß1 appears to stop nerve growth in order to promote the nerve-muscle synapse formation, however its role in vivo is unknown.

=== NMJ maintenance ===
It is known that PSCs are essential for the maintenance of NMJs during development, but PSCs are essential for mature NMJ as well. In frog ablation models, there is observable difference in NMJ properties that arise approximately seven days after PSCs were selectively removed. These changes include both structural and functional abnormalities. In ablation models, samples were taken at regular intervals following removal of PSCs. Immediately following ablatio (at 5 hours), there were no noticeable differences in synaptic structure or functionality. Motor-end plate potentials were unaltered in the pre-ablated and the 5 hour ablated models, showing that PSCs are not essential for short-term maintenance of the NMJ. Approximately 13% of ablated NMJ were observed to be retracted partially or entirely one week after ablation and there was a 50% decrease in end plate potential frequency, meaning the NMJs were firing approximately half as often! This same ablation model cannot be performed in mammals, as the antibody mAB sA12 used in the frog model does not ablate mammalian PSCs. The mammalian PSC, when treated with antibodies against gangliosides in Miller-Fisher Syndrome, show not change in NMJ properties in the short-term, but long-term data has not collected. It can be gathered that PSCs play an important role in long-term maintenance of frog NMJ, but it is unknown if the same effects are true in mammalian NMJs.

=== NMJ transmission ===
There are two proposed means by which PSCs can interact with the transmission at the NMJ. One means by which this may occur is through detecting and differentiating between synaptic transmissions, or, in a sense, “hearing” the transmission of the NMJ. The other is altering and participating in the transmission at the NMJ, or “talking” into the already existing message.

==== Listening to synaptic transmissions ====
The first evidence that the PSCs may not only serve a supportive role, was the discovery of increased Calcium levels in PSCs during NMJ transmission. This increase in intracellular calcium levels is not observed in the myelinating Schwann cells that line the axon, but only in the PSCs present at the NMJ. This increase in intracellular calcium has since been linked to synaptic neurotransmitter release in the synapse, but the relationship between Calcium release and neurotransmitters present is not perfectly linear but more complex due to a plethora of extrinsic and intrinsic factors. This ability to respond to NMJ activity can be further explored by observing pre-synaptic simulation amplitude recognition, and pattern recognition in PSCs.

It is also known that at NMJ with multiple innervations, PSCs are able to detect transmissions from the “competing sources” . This differentiation is observed by various Calcium levels proportional to the simulation amplitude. These calcium changes were different for the two competing sources. The “stronger” impulse seen by the PSCs induced a higher level of intracellular Calcium, meaning PSCs are able to distinguish the stronger of two inputs in the NMJ.

Calcium levels also vary based on the pattern in which the stimulation is delivered. A study was performed to observe glial response to both a “burst” and “continuous” impulse and the responses were not seen to be the same. These two patterns were composed of: 1800 pulses of 20 Hz with recovery time, and 1800 pulses at 20 Hz continuously. Calcium levels in response to the “burst” pattern oscillated and the Calcium levels in response to the “continuous” pattern were constant.

These findings show that the PSCs are in fact able to “recognize” unique transmissions through the NMJ. These “recognitions” are characterized by the amplitude and duration of the intracellular Calcium increase.

==== Contributing to synaptic transmission ====
As a result of responding to NMJ transmission, it is also seen that PSCs can actually alter synaptic transmissions as well. The observed increase in Calcium seen above is possible due to PSCs protein receptors: ACh receptors, ATP Receptors, G-coupled receptors, and other receptors. Manipulation of PSCs G-coupled protein receptors lead to altered synaptic transmission. If G-coupled receptors were stimulated by GTP-like ligand, the result is seen as a decrease in neurotransmitter release. If a GDP-like ligand is used to stimulate the same G-coupled receptors, it is seen that there is a reduction in synapse depression. These changes show that PSCs are a play an active role in synaptic transmission. While these interactions are measurable, the impact of PSCs activity in the NMJ is not significant in relation to the pre-synaptic motor neuron impulse, meaning the alterations that PSCs make to NMJ activity is not significant.

=== NMJ regeneration ===
PSCs have important roles in synaptogenesis during development as well as in the regeneration of nerve axons after nerve injury. If a nerve injury occurs, PSCs form PSC bridges which connect adjacent NMJ sites. The recovering axon grows along a scaffolding of basal lamina left from the damaged Schwann cells and reaches the proximal PSC site (nearest NMJ). PSC bridges connect adjacent NMJ sites and allow axonal growth from one NMJ to the other. This bridge is a shorter distance for axonal growth than the original route. Once the axon has innervated both sites, it continues growing in a retrograde direction (toward the injury site) to innervate other affected NMJs. PSCs have a large role in creating growth scaffolds from one injured NMJ to another. These PSC bridges are seen in vivo following complement-mediated injury in a murine model, showing that this role of PSCs are present in mammalian NMJs. It has also been seen that motor-end plate terminals are unstable without M_{2} ACh receptors and muscle fiber growth is uncontrolled in the absence of M_{5} ACh receptors. This shows that in NMJ regeneration, ACh receptors present on PSCs modulate and control growth.
