= Axon =

Long projection on a neuron that conducts signals to other neurons

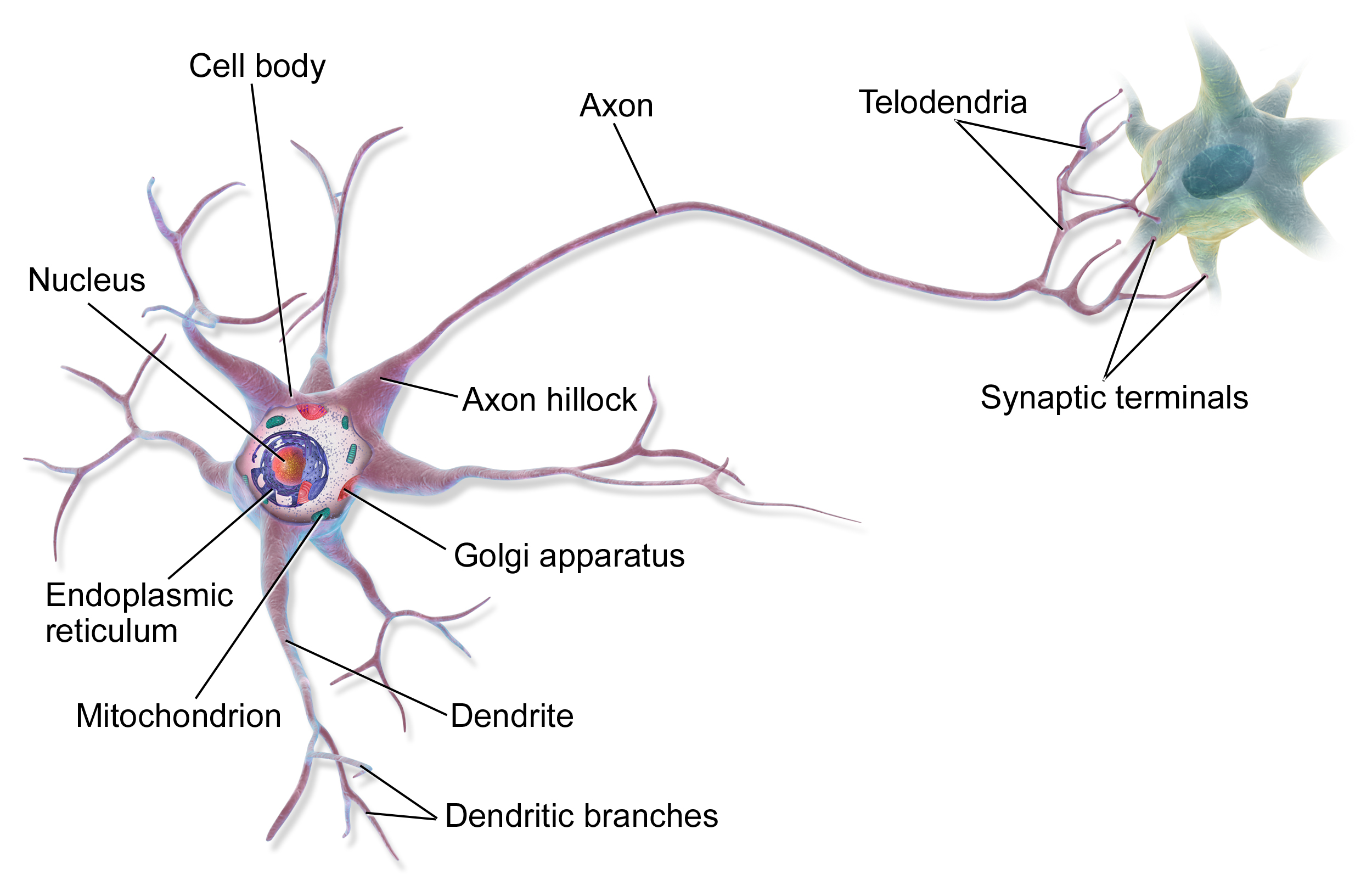
- An axon of a multipolar neuron

Identifiers
- MeSH: D001369
- FMA: 67308

An axon (from Ancient Greek: ἄξων, romanized: áxōn, lit. 'axis'; also called a nerve fiber or fibre) is a long slender projection of a nerve cell or neuron found in most animals that typically conducts electrical impulses known as action potentials away from the nerve cell body. The function of the axon is to transmit information to different neurons, muscles, and glands. In certain sensory neurons (pseudounipolar neurons), such as those for touch and warmth, the axons are called afferent nerve fibers and the electrical impulse travels along these from the periphery to the cell body and from the cell body to the spinal cord along another branch of the same axon. Axon dysfunction can be the cause of many inherited and many acquired neurological disorders that affect both the peripheral and central neurons. Vertebrate nerve fibers are classed into three types – group A nerve fibers, group B nerve fibers, and group C nerve fibers. Groups A and B are myelinated, and group C is unmyelinated. These groups include both sensory fibers and motor fibers. Another classification groups only the sensory fibers into four categories: Type I, Type II, Type III, and Type IV.

An axon is one of two types of cytoplasmic protrusions from the cell body of a neuron; the other type is a dendrite. Axons are distinguished from dendrites by several features, including shape (dendrites often taper while axons usually maintain a constant radius), length (dendrites are restricted to a small region around the cell body while axons can be much longer), and function (dendrites receive signals whereas axons transmit them). Some types of neurons have no axon and transmit signals from their dendrites. In some species, axons can emanate from dendrites known as axon-carrying dendrites. Neurons rarely have more than one axon; however, in invertebrates such as insects, decapods and leeches, the axon sometimes consists of several regions that function more or less independently of each other, and multiple axons can emerge from a single cell body in lobster cardiac ganglia.

Axons are covered by a membrane known as an axolemma; the cytoplasm within an axon is called axoplasm. Most axons branch, in some cases very profusely. The end branches of an axon are called telodendria. The swollen end of a telodendron is known as the axon terminal, or end-foot, which joins the dendrite or cell body of another neuron to form a synaptic connection. Axons usually make contact with other neurons at junctions called synapses, but they can also make contact with muscle or gland cells. In some circumstances, the axon of one neuron may form a synapse with the dendrites of the same neuron, resulting in an autapse. At a synapse, the membrane of the axon closely adjoins the membrane of the target cell, and special molecular structures serve to transmit electrical or electrochemical signals across the gap. Some synaptic junctions appear along the length of an axon as it extends; these are called en passant boutons ("in passing boutons") and can be in the hundreds or even the thousands along one axon. Other synapses appear as terminals at the ends of axonal branches.

A single axon, with all its branches taken together, can target multiple parts of the brain and generate thousands of synaptic terminals. A bundle of axons makes a nerve tract in the central nervous system, and a fascicle in the peripheral nervous system. In placental mammals, the largest white matter tract in the brain is the corpus callosum, formed of some 200 million axons in the human brain.

== Anatomy ==
Structure of a typical neuron in the peripheral nervous system

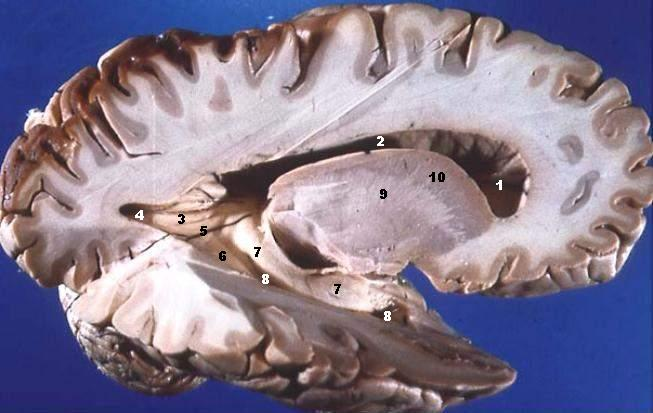
A dissected human brain, showing grey matter and white matter

Axons are the primary transmission lines of the nervous system, and as bundles they form nerves in the peripheral nervous system, or nerve tracts in the central nervous system (CNS). Some axons can extend up to one meter or more while others extend as little as one millimeter. The longest axons in the human body are those of the sciatic nerve, which run from the base of the spinal cord to the big toe of each foot. The diameter of axons is also variable. Most individual axons are microscopic in diameter (typically about one micrometer (μm) across). The largest mammalian axons can reach a diameter of up to 20 μm. The squid giant axon, which is specialized to conduct signals very rapidly, is close to 1 millimeter in diameter, the size of a small pencil lead. The numbers of axonal telodendria (the branching structures at the end of the axon) can also differ from one nerve fiber to the next. Axons in the CNS typically show multiple telodendria, with many synaptic end points. In comparison, the cerebellar granule cell axon is characterized by a single T-shaped branch node from which two parallel fibers extend. Elaborate branching allows for the simultaneous transmission of messages to a large number of target neurons within a single region of the brain.

There are two types of axons in the nervous system: myelinated and unmyelinated axons. Myelin is a layer of a fatty insulating substance, which is formed by two types of glial cells: Schwann cells and oligodendrocytes. In the peripheral nervous system Schwann cells form the myelin sheath of a myelinated axon. Oligodendrocytes form the insulating myelin in the CNS. Along myelinated nerve fibers, gaps in the myelin sheath known as nodes of Ranvier occur at evenly spaced intervals. The myelination enables an especially rapid mode of electrical impulse propagation called saltatory conduction.

The myelinated axons from the cortical neurons form the bulk of the neural tissue called white matter in the brain. The myelin gives the white appearance to the tissue in contrast to the grey matter of the cerebral cortex which contains the neuronal cell bodies. A similar arrangement is seen in the cerebellum. Bundles of myelinated axons make up the nerve tracts in the CNS, and where they cross the midline of the brain to connect opposite regions they are called commissures. The largest of these is the corpus callosum that connects the two cerebral hemispheres, and this has around 20 million axons.

The structure of a neuron is seen to consist of two separate functional regions, or compartments – the cell body together with the dendrites as one region, and the axonal region as the other.

=== Axonal region ===
The axonal region or compartment, includes the axon hillock, the initial segment, the rest of the axon, and the axon telodendria, and axon terminals. It also includes the myelin sheath. The Nissl bodies that produce the neuronal proteins are absent in the axonal region. Proteins needed for the growth of the axon, and the removal of waste materials, need a framework for transport. This axonal transport is provided for in the axoplasm by arrangements of microtubules and type IV intermediate filaments known as neurofilaments.

==== Axon hillock ====
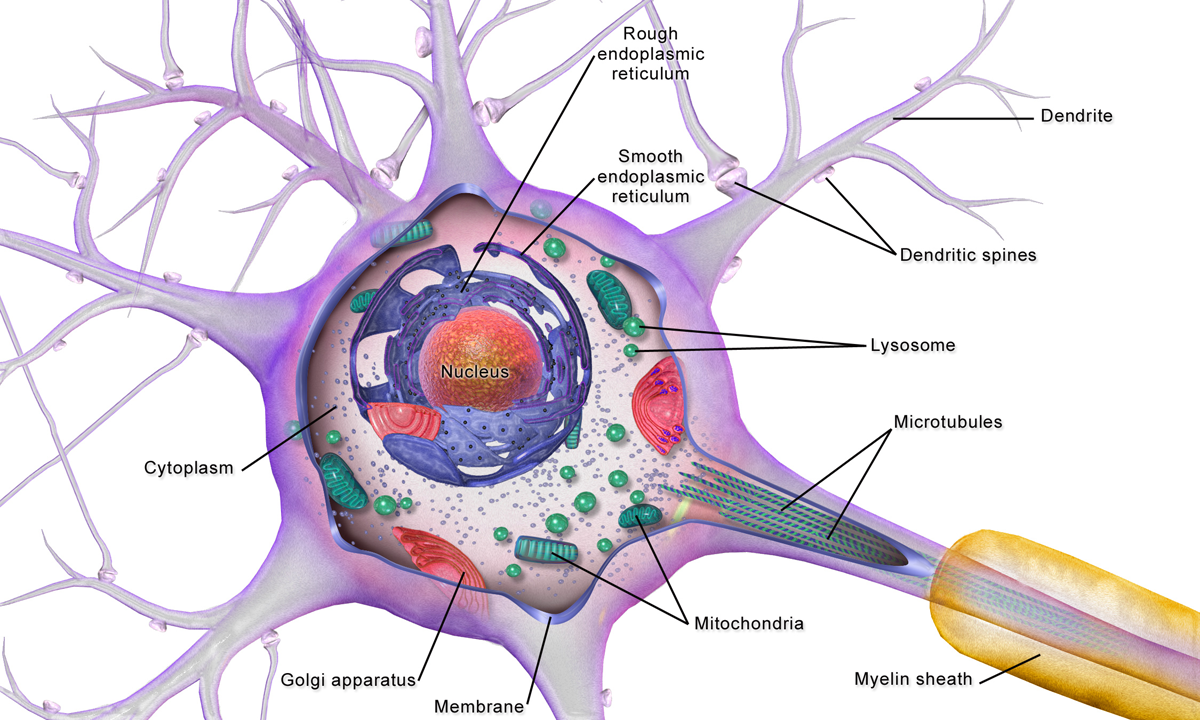
Detail showing microtubules at axon hillock and initial segment

The axon hillock is the area formed from the cell body of the neuron as it extends to become the axon. It precedes the initial segment. The received action potentials that are summed in the neuron are transmitted to the axon hillock for the generation of an action potential from the initial segment.

==== Axonal initial segment ====
The axonal initial segment (AIS) is a structurally and functionally separate microdomain of the axon. One function of the initial segment is to separate the main part of an axon from the rest of the neuron; another function is to help initiate action potentials. Both of these functions support neuron cell polarity, in which dendrites (and, in some cases the soma) of a neuron receive input signals at the basal region, and at the apical region the neuron's axon provides output signals.

The axon initial segment is unmyelinated and contains a specialized complex of proteins. It is between approximately 20 and 60 μm in length and functions as the site of action potential initiation. Both the position on the axon and the length of the AIS can change showing a degree of plasticity that can fine-tune the neuronal output. A longer AIS is associated with a greater excitability. Plasticity is also seen in the ability of the AIS to change its distribution and to maintain the activity of neural circuitry at a constant level.

The AIS is highly specialized for the fast conduction of nerve impulses. This is achieved by a high concentration of voltage-gated sodium channels in the initial segment where the action potential is initiated. The ion channels are accompanied by a high number of cell adhesion molecules and scaffold proteins that anchor them to the cytoskeleton. Interactions with ankyrin-G are important as it is the major organizer in the AIS.

In other cases as seen in rat studies an axon originates from a dendrite; such axons are said to have "dendritic origin". Some axons with dendritic origin similarly have a "proximal" initial segment that starts directly at the axon origin, while others have a "distal" initial segment, discernibly separated from the axon origin. In many species some of the neurons have axons that emanate from the dendrite and not from the cell body, and these are known as axon-carrying dendrites. In many cases, an axon originates at an axon hillock on the soma; such axons are said to have "somatic origin". Some axons with somatic origin have a "proximal" initial segment adjacent the axon hillock, while others have a "distal" initial segment, separated from the soma by an extended axon hillock.

=== Axonal transport ===
The axoplasm is the equivalent of cytoplasm in the cell. Microtubules form in the axoplasm at the axon hillock. They are arranged along the length of the axon, in overlapping sections, and all point in the same direction – towards the axon terminals. This is noted by the positive endings of the microtubules. This overlapping arrangement provides the routes for the transport of different materials from the cell body. Studies on the axoplasm has shown the movement of numerous vesicles of all sizes to be seen along cytoskeletal filaments – the microtubules, and neurofilaments, in both directions between the axon and its terminals and the cell body.

Outgoing anterograde transport from the cell body along the axon, carries mitochondria and membrane proteins needed for growth to the axon terminal. Ingoing retrograde transport carries cell waste materials from the axon terminal to the cell body. Outgoing and ingoing tracks use different sets of motor proteins. Outgoing transport is provided by kinesin, and ingoing return traffic is provided by dynein. Dynein is minus-end directed. There are many forms of kinesin and dynein motor proteins, and each is thought to carry a different cargo. The studies on transport in the axon led to the naming of kinesin.

=== Myelination ===
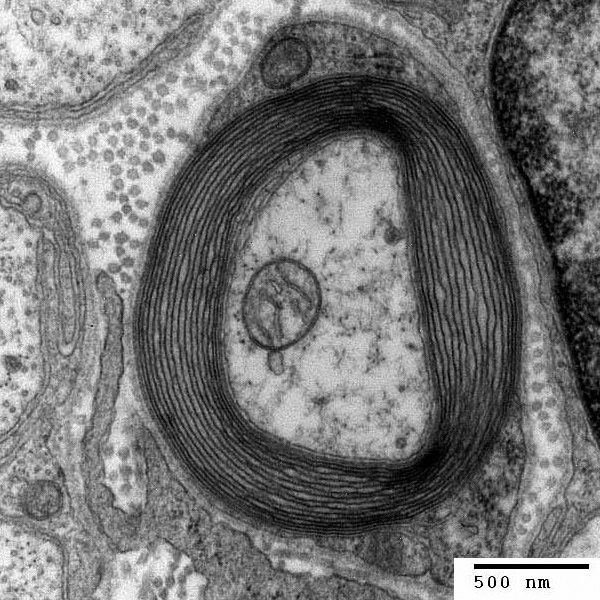
TEM of a myelinated axon in cross-section

Cross section of an axon: (1) Axon (2) Nucleus (3) Schwann cell (4) Myelin sheath (5) Neurilemma

In the nervous system, axons may be myelinated, or unmyelinated. This is the provision of an insulating layer, called a myelin sheath. The myelin membrane is unique in its relatively high lipid to protein ratio.

In the peripheral nervous system axons are myelinated by glial cells known as Schwann cells. In the central nervous system the myelin sheath is provided by another type of glial cell, the oligodendrocyte. Schwann cells myelinate a single axon. An oligodendrocyte can myelinate up to 50 axons.

The composition of myelin is different in the two types. In the CNS the major myelin protein is proteolipid protein, and in the PNS it is myelin basic protein.

=== Nodes of Ranvier ===
Nodes of Ranvier (also known as myelin sheath gaps) are short unmyelinated segments of a myelinated axon, which are found periodically interspersed between segments of the myelin sheath. Therefore, at the point of the node of Ranvier, the axon is reduced in diameter. These nodes are areas where action potentials can be generated. In saltatory conduction, electrical currents produced at each node of Ranvier are conducted with little attenuation to the next node in line, where they remain strong enough to generate another action potential. Thus in a myelinated axon, action potentials effectively "jump" from node to node, bypassing the myelinated stretches in between, resulting in a propagation speed much faster than even the fastest unmyelinated axon can sustain.

=== Axon terminals ===
An axon can divide into many branches called telodendria (Greek for 'end of tree'). At the end of each telodendron is an axon terminal (also called a terminal bouton or synaptic bouton, or end-foot). Axon terminals contain synaptic vesicles that store the neurotransmitter for release at the synapse. This makes multiple synaptic connections with other neurons possible. Sometimes the axon of a neuron may synapse onto dendrites of the same neuron, when it is known as an autapse. Some synaptic junctions appear along the length of an axon as it extends; these are called en passant boutons ("in passing boutons") and can be in the hundreds or even the thousands along one axon.

==== Axonal varicosities ====
In the normally developed brain, along the shaft of some axons are located pre-synaptic boutons also known as axonal varicosities and these have been found in regions of the hippocampus that function in the release of neurotransmitters. However, axonal varicosities are also present in neurodegenerative diseases where they interfere with the conduction of an action potential. Axonal varicosities are also the hallmark of traumatic brain injuries. Axonal damage is usually to the axon cytoskeleton disrupting transport. As a consequence protein accumulations such as amyloid-beta precursor protein can build up in a swelling resulting in a number of varicosities along the axon.

== Action potentials ==
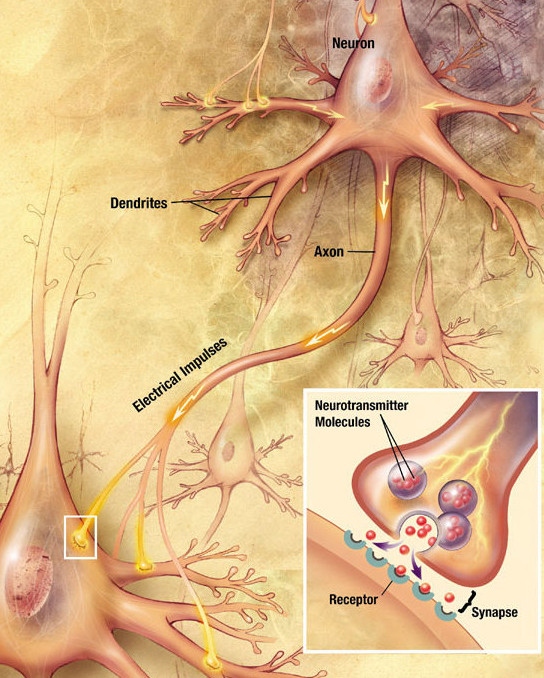
Synaptic connections from an axon

Neurotransmitter released from presynaptic axon terminal, and transported across synaptic cleft to receptors on postsynaptic neuron

Most axons carry signals in the form of action potentials, which are discrete electrochemical impulses that travel rapidly along an axon, starting at the cell body and terminating at points where the axon makes synaptic contact with target cells. The defining characteristic of an action potential is that it is "all-or-nothing" – every action potential that an axon generates has essentially the same size and shape. This all-or-nothing characteristic allows action potentials to be transmitted from one end of a long axon to the other without any reduction in size. There are, however, some types of neurons with short axons that carry graded electrochemical signals, of variable amplitude.

When an action potential reaches a presynaptic terminal, it activates the synaptic transmission process. The first step is rapid opening of calcium ion channels in the membrane of the axon, allowing calcium ions to flow inward across the membrane. The resulting increase in intracellular calcium concentration causes synaptic vesicles (tiny containers enclosed by a lipid membrane) filled with a neurotransmitter chemical to fuse with the axon's membrane and empty their contents into the extracellular space. The neurotransmitter is released from the presynaptic nerve through exocytosis. The neurotransmitter chemical then diffuses across to receptors located on the membrane of the target cell. The neurotransmitter binds to these receptors and activates them. Depending on the type of receptors that are activated, the effect on the target cell can be to excite the target cell, inhibit it, or alter its metabolism in some way. This entire sequence of events often takes place in less than a thousandth of a second. Afterward, inside the presynaptic terminal, a new set of vesicles is moved into position next to the membrane, ready to be released when the next action potential arrives. The action potential is the final electrical step in the integration of synaptic messages at the scale of the neuron.

Extracellular recordings of action potential propagation in axons has been demonstrated in freely moving animals. While extracellular somatic action potentials have been used to study cellular activity in freely moving animals such as place cells, axonal activity in both white and gray matter can also be recorded. Extracellular recordings of axon action potential propagation is distinct from somatic action potentials in three ways: 1. The signal has a shorter peak-trough duration (~150μs) than of pyramidal cells (~500μs) or interneurons (~250μs). 2. The voltage change is triphasic. 3. Activity recorded on a tetrode is seen on only one of the four recording wires. In recordings from freely moving rats, axonal signals have been isolated in white matter tracts including the alveus and the corpus callosum as well hippocampal gray matter.

In fact, the generation of action potentials in vivo is sequential in nature, and these sequential spikes constitute the digital codes in the neurons. Although previous studies indicate an axonal origin of a single spike evoked by short-term pulses, physiological signals in vivo trigger the initiation of sequential spikes at the cell bodies of the neurons.

In addition to propagating action potentials to axonal terminals, the axon is able to amplify the action potentials, which makes sure a secure propagation of sequential action potentials toward the axonal terminal. In terms of molecular mechanisms, voltage-gated sodium channels in the axons possess lower threshold and shorter refractory period in response to short-term pulses.

== Development and growth ==
=== Development ===
The development of the axon to its target, is one of the six major stages in the overall development of the nervous system. Studies done on cultured hippocampal neurons suggest that neurons initially produce multiple neurites that are equivalent, yet only one of these neurites is destined to become the axon. It is unclear whether axon specification precedes axon elongation or vice versa, although recent evidence points to the latter. If an axon that is not fully developed is cut, the polarity can change and other neurites can potentially become the axon. This alteration of polarity only occurs when the axon is cut at least 10 μm shorter than the other neurites. After the incision is made, the longest neurite will become the future axon and all the other neurites, including the original axon, will turn into dendrites. Imposing an external force on a neurite, causing it to elongate, will make it become an axon. Nonetheless, axonal development is achieved through a complex interplay between extracellular signaling, intracellular signaling and cytoskeletal dynamics.

==== Extracellular signaling ====
The extracellular signals that propagate through the extracellular matrix surrounding neurons play a prominent role in axonal development. These signaling molecules include proteins, neurotrophic factors, and extracellular matrix and adhesion molecules. Netrin (also known as UNC-6) a secreted protein, functions in axon formation. When the UNC-5 netrin receptor is mutated, several neurites are irregularly projected out of neurons and finally a single axon is extended anteriorly. The neurotrophic factors – nerve growth factor (NGF), brain-derived neurotrophic factor (BDNF) and neurotrophin-3 (NTF3) are also involved in axon development and bind to Trk receptors.

The ganglioside-converting enzyme plasma membrane ganglioside sialidase (PMGS), which is involved in the activation of TrkA at the tip of neutrites, is required for the elongation of axons. PMGS asymmetrically distributes to the tip of the neurite that is destined to become the future axon.

==== Intracellular signaling ====
During axonal development, the activity of PI3K is increased at the tip of destined axon. Disrupting the activity of PI3K inhibits axonal development. Activation of PI3K results in the production of phosphatidylinositol (3,4,5)-trisphosphate (PtdIns) which can cause significant elongation of a neurite, converting it into an axon. As such, the overexpression of phosphatases that dephosphorylate PtdIns leads into the failure of polarization.

==== Cytoskeletal dynamics ====
The neurite with the lowest actin filament content will become the axon. PGMS concentration and f-actin content are inversely correlated; when PGMS becomes enriched at the tip of a neurite, its f-actin content is substantially decreased. In addition, exposure to actin-depolimerizing drugs and toxin B (which inactivates Rho-signaling) causes the formation of multiple axons. Consequently, the interruption of the actin network in a growth cone will promote its neurite to become the axon.

=== Growth ===
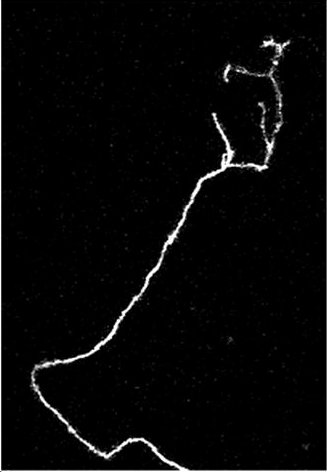
Axon of nine-day-old mouse with growth cone visible

Growing axons move through their environment via the growth cone, which is at the tip of the axon. The growth cone has a broad sheet-like extension called a lamellipodium which contain protrusions called filopodia. The filopodia are the mechanism by which the entire process adheres to surfaces and explores the surrounding environment. Actin plays a major role in the mobility of this system. Environments with high levels of cell adhesion molecules (CAMs) create an ideal environment for axonal growth. This seems to provide a "sticky" surface for axons to grow along. Examples of CAMs specific to neural systems include N-CAM, TAG-1 – an axonal glycoprotein – and MAG, all of which are part of the immunoglobulin superfamily. Another set of molecules called extracellular matrix-adhesion molecules also provide a sticky substrate for axons to grow along. Examples of these molecules include laminin, fibronectin, tenascin, and perlecan. Some of these are surface bound to cells and thus act as short range attractants or repellents. Others are diffusible ligands and thus can have long range effects.

Cells called guidepost cells assist in the guidance of neuronal axon growth. These cells that help axon guidance, are typically other neurons that are sometimes immature. When the axon has completed its growth at its connection to the target, the diameter of the axon can increase by up to five times, depending on the speed of conduction required.

It has also been discovered through research that if the axons of a neuron were damaged, as long as the soma (the cell body of a neuron) is not damaged, the axons would regenerate and remake the synaptic connections with neurons with the help of guidepost cells. This is also referred to as neuroregeneration.

Nogo-A is a type of neurite outgrowth inhibitory component that is present in the central nervous system myelin membranes (found in an axon). It has a crucial role in restricting axonal regeneration in adult mammalian central nervous system. In recent studies, if Nogo-A is blocked and neutralized, it is possible to induce long-distance axonal regeneration which leads to enhancement of functional recovery in rats and mouse spinal cord. This has yet to be done on humans. A recent study has also found that macrophages activated through a specific inflammatory pathway activated by the Dectin-1 receptor are capable of promoting axon recovery, also however causing neurotoxicity in the neuron.

=== Length regulation ===
Axons vary largely in length from a few micrometers up to meters in some animals. This emphasizes that there must be a cellular length regulation mechanism allowing the neurons both to sense the length of their axons and to control their growth accordingly. It was discovered that motor proteins play an important role in regulating the length of axons. Based on this observation, researchers developed an explicit model for axonal growth describing how motor proteins could affect the axon length on the molecular level. These studies suggest that motor proteins carry signaling molecules from the soma to the growth cone and vice versa whose concentration oscillates in time with a length-dependent frequency.

== Classification ==
The axons of neurons in the human peripheral nervous system can be classified based on their physical features and signal conduction properties. Axons were known to have different thicknesses (from 0.1 to 20 μm) and these differences were thought to relate to the speed at which an action potential could travel along the axon – its conductance velocity. Erlanger and Gasser proved this hypothesis, and identified several types of nerve fiber, establishing a relationship between the diameter of an axon and its nerve conduction velocity. They published their findings in 1941 giving the first classification of axons.

Axons are classified in two systems. The first one introduced by Erlanger and Gasser, grouped the fibers into three main groups using the letters A, B, and C. These groups, group A, group B, and group C include both the sensory fibers (afferents) and the motor fibers (efferents). The first group A, was subdivided into alpha, beta, gamma, and delta fibers – Aα, Aβ, Aγ, and Aδ. The motor neurons of the different motor fibers, were the lower motor neurons – alpha motor neuron, beta motor neuron, and gamma motor neuron having the Aα, Aβ, and Aγ nerve fibers, respectively.

Later findings by other researchers identified two groups of Aa fibers that were sensory fibers. These were then introduced into a system (Lloyd classification) that only included sensory fibers (though some of these were mixed nerves and were also motor fibers). This system refers to the sensory groups as Types and uses Roman numerals: Type Ia, Type Ib, Type II, Type III, and Type IV.

=== Motor ===
Lower motor neurons have two kind of fibers:

Motor fiber types
Type	Erlanger-Gasser Classification	Diameter (μm)	Myelin	Conduction velocity (meters/second)	Associated muscle fibers
Alpha (α) motor neuron	Aα	13–20	Yes	80–120	Extrafusal muscle fibers
Beta (β) motor neuron	Aβ				
Gamma (γ) motor neuron	Aγ	5-8	Yes	4–24	Intrafusal muscle fibers

=== Sensory ===
Different sensory receptors are innervated by different types of nerve fibers. Proprioceptors are innervated by type Ia, Ib and II sensory fibers, mechanoreceptors by type II and III sensory fibers and nociceptors and thermoreceptors by type III and IV sensory fibers.

Sensory fiber types
Type	Erlanger-Gasser Classification	Diameter (μm)	Myelin	Conduction velocity (m/s)	Associated sensory receptors	Proprioceptors	Mechanoceptors	Nociceptors and thermoreceptors
Ia	Aα	13–20	Yes	80–120	Primary receptors of muscle spindle (annulospiral ending)	✔		
Ib	Aα	13–20	Yes	80–120	Golgi tendon organ	✔		
II	Aβ	6–12	Yes	33–75	Secondary receptors of muscle spindle (flower-spray ending). All cutaneous mechanoreceptors	✔	✔	
III	Aδ	1–5	Thin	3–30	Free nerve endings of touch and pressure Nociceptors of lateral spinothalamic tract Cold thermoreceptors		✔	✔
IV	C	0.2–1.5	No	0.5–2.0	Nociceptors of anterior spinothalamic tract Warmth receptors			✔

=== Autonomic ===
The autonomic nervous system has two kinds of peripheral fibers:

Fiber types
Type	Erlanger-Gasser Classification	Diameter (μm)	Myelin	Conduction velocity (m/s)
preganglionic fibers	B	0.5–3	Yes	3–15
postganglionic fibers	C	0.2–1.4	No	0.5–2.0

== Clinical significance ==
In order of degree of severity, injury to a nerve in the peripheral nervous system can be described as neurapraxia, axonotmesis, or neurotmesis. Concussion is considered a mild form of diffuse axonal injury. Axonal injury can also cause central chromatolysis. The dysfunction of axons in the nervous system is one of the major causes of many inherited and acquired neurological disorders that affect both peripheral and central neurons.

When an axon is crushed, an active process of axonal degeneration takes place at the part of the axon furthest from the cell body. This degeneration takes place quickly following the injury, with the part of the axon being sealed off at the membranes and broken down by macrophages. This is known as Wallerian degeneration. Dying back of an axon can also take place in many neurodegenerative diseases, particularly when axonal transport is impaired, this is known as Wallerian-like degeneration. Studies suggest that the degeneration happens as a result of the axonal protein NMNAT2, being prevented from reaching all of the axon.

Demyelination of axons causes the multitude of neurological symptoms found in the disease multiple sclerosis.

Dysmyelination is the abnormal formation of the myelin sheath. This is implicated in several leukodystrophies, and also in schizophrenia.

A severe traumatic brain injury can result in widespread lesions to nerve tracts damaging the axons in a condition known as diffuse axonal injury. This can lead to a persistent vegetative state. It has been shown in studies on the rat that axonal damage from a single mild traumatic brain injury, can leave a susceptibility to further damage, after repeated mild traumatic brain injuries.

A nerve guidance conduit is an artificial means of guiding axon growth to enable neuroregeneration, and is one of the many treatments used for different kinds of nerve injury.

== Terminology ==
Some general dictionaries define "nerve fiber" as any neuronal process, including both axons and dendrites. However, medical sources generally use "nerve fiber" to refer to the axon only.

== History ==
German anatomist Otto Friedrich Karl Deiters is generally credited with the discovery of the axon by distinguishing it from the dendrites. Swiss Rüdolf Albert von Kölliker and German Robert Remak were the first to identify and characterize the axon initial segment. Kölliker named the axon in 1896. Louis-Antoine Ranvier was the first to describe the gaps or nodes found on axons and for this contribution these axonal features are now commonly referred to as the nodes of Ranvier. Santiago Ramón y Cajal, a Spanish anatomist, proposed that axons were the output components of neurons, describing their functionality. Joseph Erlanger and Herbert Gasser earlier developed the classification system for peripheral nerve fibers, based on axonal conduction velocity, myelination, fiber size etc. Alan Hodgkin and Andrew Huxley also employed the squid giant axon (1939) and by 1952 they had obtained a full quantitative description of the ionic basis of the action potential, leading to the formulation of the Hodgkin–Huxley model. Hodgkin and Huxley were awarded jointly the Nobel Prize for this work in 1963. The formulae detailing axonal conductance were extended to vertebrates in the Frankenhaeuser–Huxley equations. The understanding of the biochemical basis for action potential propagation has advanced further, and includes many details about individual ion channels.

== Other animals ==
The axons in invertebrates have been extensively studied. The longfin inshore squid, often used as a model organism has the longest known axon. The giant squid has the largest axon known. Its size ranges from 0.5 (typically) to 1 mm in diameter and is used in the control of its jet propulsion system. The fastest recorded conduction speed of 210 m/s, is found in the ensheathed axons of some pelagic Penaeid shrimps and the usual range is between 90 and 200 meters/s (cf 100–120 m/s for the fastest myelinated vertebrate axon.)

== Additional images ==
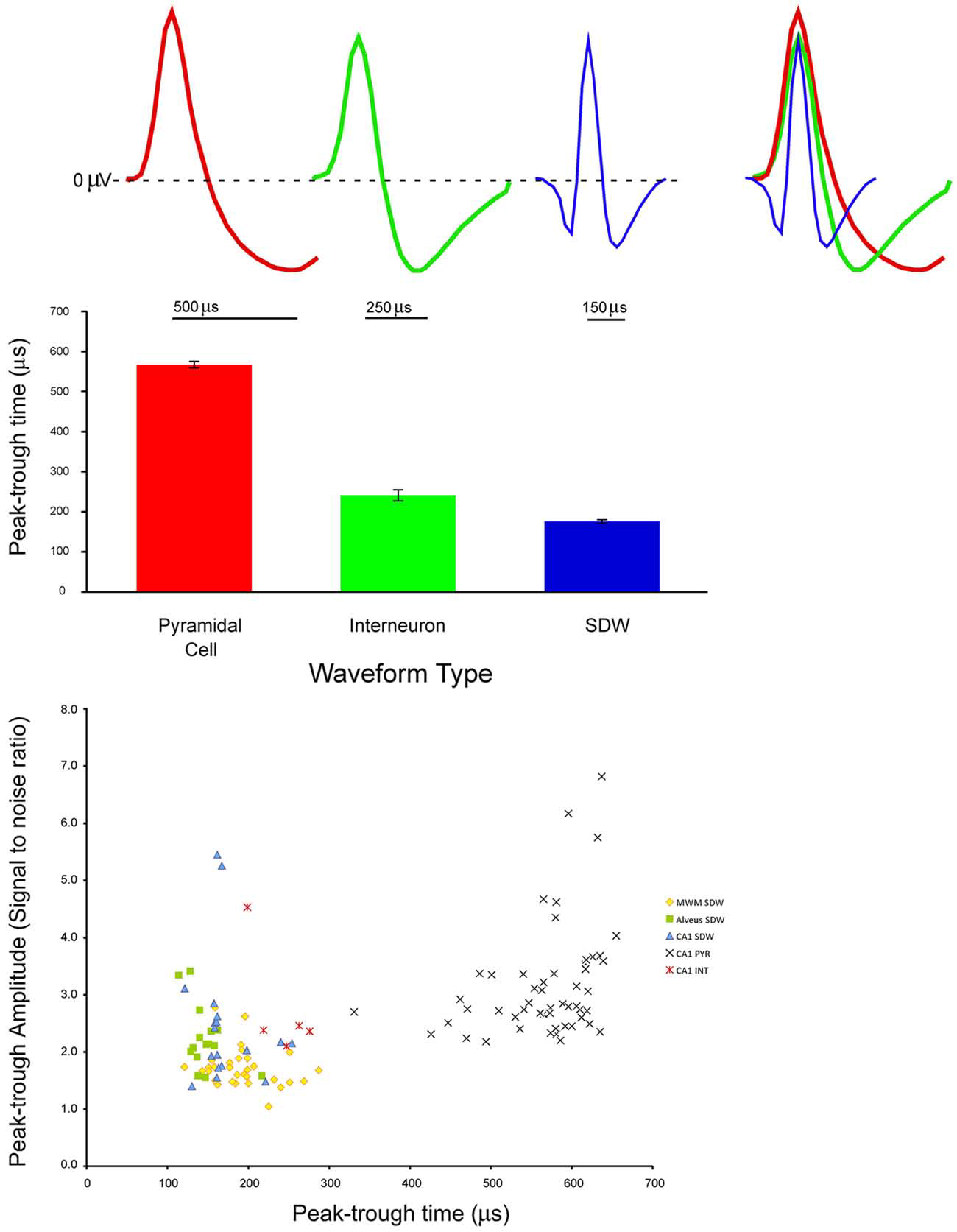
Recordings in the hippocampus from different cell types and axons

== See also ==
- Electrophysiology
- Ganglionic eminence
- Giant axonal neuropathy
- Neuronal tracing
- Pioneer axon
- Single-unit recording
