= MAZ (gene) =

Protein-coding gene in the species Homo sapiens

Identifiers
- Aliases: MAZ, PUR1, Pur-1, SAF-1, SAF-2, SAF-3, ZF87, ZNF801, Zif87, MYC associated zinc finger protein
- External IDs: OMIM: 600999; MGI: 1338823; GeneCards: MAZ

Gene location (Human)
Chr.	Chromosome 16 (human)
Band	16p11.2	Start	29,806,106 bp
Band	16p11.2	End	29,811,164 bp

Gene location (Mouse)
Chr.	Chromosome 7 (mouse)
Band	7|7 F3	Start	126,621,302 bp
Band	7|7 F3	End	126,626,209 bp
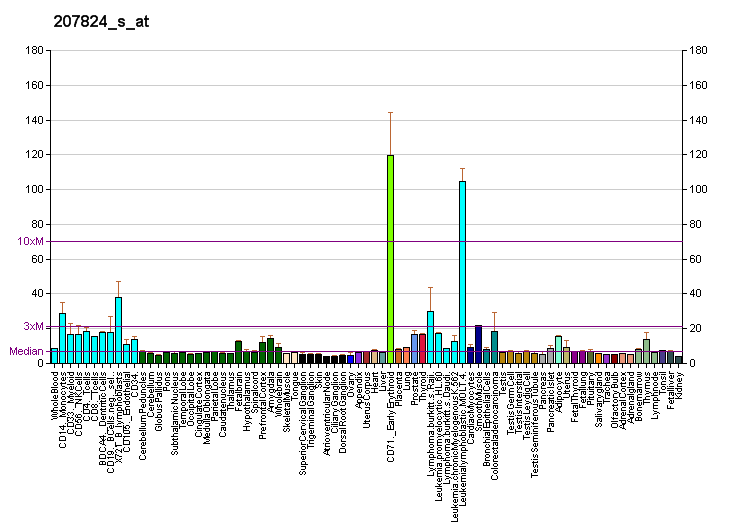

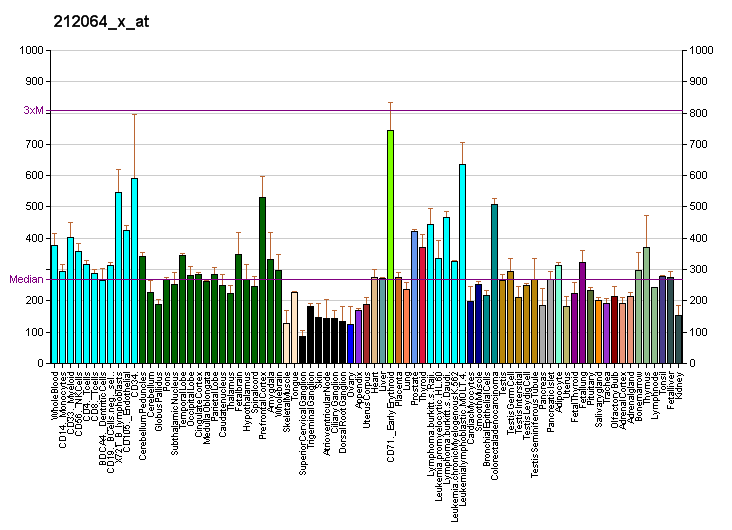
RNA expression pattern
Bgee	Human / Mouse (ortholog); Top expressed in: ventricular zone; ganglionic eminence; right hemisphere of cerebellum; mucosa of transverse colon; stromal cell of endometrium; granulocyte; right frontal lobe; tendon of biceps brachii; left testis; muscle layer of sigmoid colon / Top expressed in: ventricular zone; yolk sac; neural layer of retina; superior frontal gyrus; dentate gyrus of hippocampal formation granule cell; genital tubercle; muscle of thigh; lip; tail of embryo; granulocyte; More reference expression data
BioGPS	More reference expression data
Gene ontology
Molecular function	DNA binding; protein binding; RNA polymerase II core promoter sequence-specific DNA binding; metal ion binding; nucleic acid binding; RNA binding; RNA polymerase II cis-regulatory region sequence-specific DNA binding; DNA-binding transcription factor activity, RNA polymerase II-specific
Cellular component	nucleus
Biological process	termination of RNA polymerase II transcription; transcription initiation from RNA polymerase II promoter; regulation of transcription, DNA-templated; transcription, DNA-templated; regulation of transcription by RNA polymerase II; positive regulation of cell population proliferation; positive regulation of gene expression; positive regulation of phosphatidylinositol 3-kinase signaling; positive regulation of cell migration; positive regulation of transcription, DNA-templated; positive regulation of protein kinase B signaling; negative regulation of apoptotic signaling pathway
Sources:Amigo / QuickGO
Orthologs
Databases	NCBI: entry; OMA: entry
Species	Human	Mouse
Entrez	4150	17188
Ensembl	ENSG00000103495	ENSMUSG00000030678
UniProt	P56270	P56671
RefSeq (mRNA)	NM_001042539; NM_001276275; NM_001276276; NM_002383	NM_010772; NM_001372521; NM_001372522; NM_001372523
RefSeq (protein)	NP_001036004; NP_001263204; NP_001263205; NP_002374	n/a
Location (UCSC)	Chr 16: 29.81 – 29.81 Mb	Chr 7: 126.62 – 126.63 Mb
PubMed search
- Wikidata
View/Edit Human	View/Edit Mouse

Myc-associated zinc finger protein is a protein that in humans is encoded by the MAZ gene.

== Interactions ==
MAZ (gene) has been shown to interact with BPTF and Deleted in Colorectal Cancer.
