= BPTF =

Protein-coding gene in the species Homo sapiens

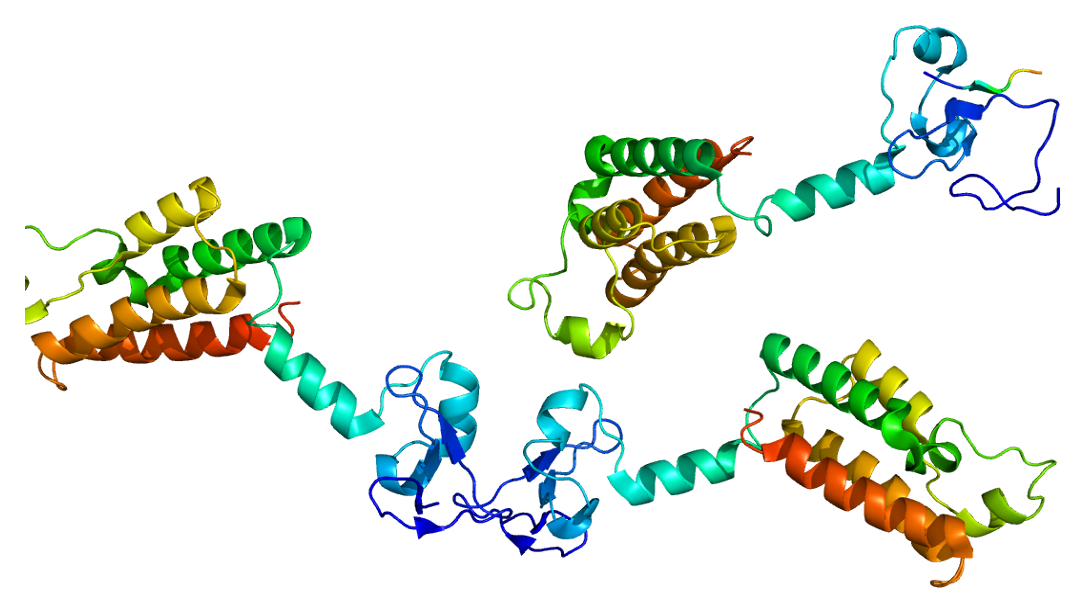

Identifiers
- Aliases: BPTF, FAC1, FALZ, NURF301, bromodomain PHD finger transcription factor, NEDDFL
- External IDs: OMIM: 601819; MGI: 2444008; GeneCards: BPTF
Available structures
PDB	Human UniProt search: PDBe RCSB
PDB	List of PDB id codes 2F6J, 2F6N, 2FSA, 2FUI, 2FUU, 2RI7, 3QZS, 3QZT, 3QZV, 3UV2

Gene location (Human)
Chr.	Chromosome 17 (human)
Band	17q24.2	Start	67,825,503 bp
Band	17q24.2	End	67,984,378 bp

Gene location (Mouse)
Chr.	Chromosome 11 (mouse)
Band	11|11 E1	Start	106,923,907 bp
Band	11|11 E1	End	107,022,953 bp
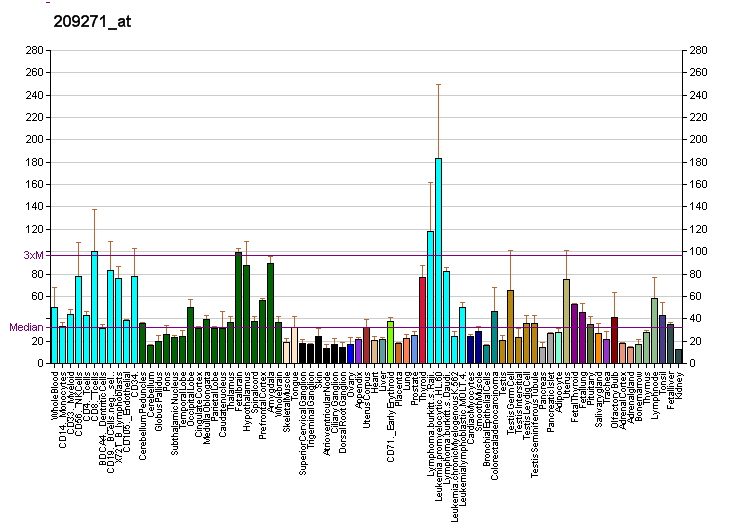

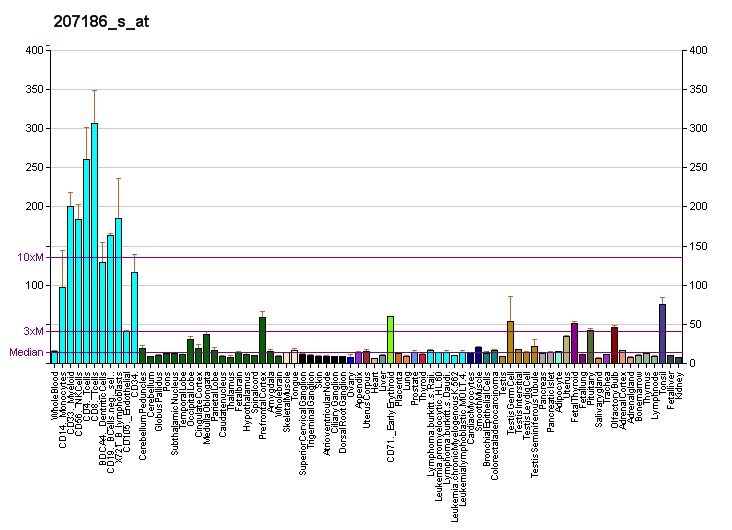
RNA expression pattern
Bgee	Human / Mouse (ortholog); Top expressed in: sural nerve; ventricular zone; ganglionic eminence; corpus callosum; cerebellar hemisphere; right hemisphere of cerebellum; epithelium of colon; testicle; tonsil; left ovary / Top expressed in: saccule; otic placode; otic vesicle; Rostral migratory stream; internal carotid artery; substantia nigra; external carotid artery; vas deferens; Gonadal ridge; medullary collecting duct; More reference expression data
BioGPS	More reference expression data
Gene ontology
Molecular function	sequence-specific DNA binding; ATP-dependent activity, acting on DNA; transcription factor binding; metal ion binding; protein binding; methylated histone binding
Cellular component	cytoplasm; cell body; nucleoplasm; dendrite; NURF complex; perinuclear region of cytoplasm; neuron projection; extracellular exosome; nucleus; Set1C/COMPASS complex
Biological process	chromatin remodeling; cellular response to nerve growth factor stimulus; endoderm development; regulation of transcription, DNA-templated; embryonic placenta development; negative regulation of transcription by RNA polymerase II; transcription, DNA-templated; positive regulation of transcription, DNA-templated; brain development; response to wounding; anterior/posterior pattern specification; chromatin organization; regulation of transcription by RNA polymerase II; positive regulation of transcription by RNA polymerase II
Sources:Amigo / QuickGO
Orthologs
Databases	NCBI: entry; OMA: entry
Species	Human	Mouse
Entrez	2186	207165
Ensembl	ENSG00000171634	ENSMUSG00000040481
UniProt	Q12830	n/a
RefSeq (mRNA)	NM_004459; NM_182641	NM_001080832; NM_176850; NM_001359590
RefSeq (protein)	NP_004450; NP_872579	n/a
Location (UCSC)	Chr 17: 67.83 – 67.98 Mb	Chr 11: 106.92 – 107.02 Mb
PubMed search
- Wikidata
View/Edit Human	View/Edit Mouse

Nucleosome-remodeling factor subunit BPTF is a protein that in humans is encoded by the BPTF gene.

This gene was identified by the reactivity of its encoded protein to a monoclonal antibody prepared against brain homogenates from patients with Alzheimer's disease. Analysis of the original protein (fetal Alz-50 reactive clone 1, or FAC1), identified as an 810 aa protein containing a DNA-binding domain and a zinc finger motif, suggested it might play a role in the regulation of transcription. High levels of FAC1 were detected in fetal brain and in patients with neurodegenerative diseases. The protein encoded by this gene is actually much larger than originally thought, and it also contains a C-terminal bromodomain characteristic of proteins that regulate transcription during proliferation. The encoded protein is highly similar to the largest subunit of the Drosophila NURF (nucleosome remodeling factor) complex. In Drosophila, the NURF complex, which catalyzes nucleosome sliding on DNA and interacts with sequence-specific transcription factors, is necessary for the chromatin remodeling required for transcription. Two alternative transcripts encoding different isoforms have been described completely.

== Interactions ==
BPTF has been shown to interact with MAZ.
