= Furstner =

Furstner, Fürstner, or Fuerstner may refer to:

- Adolph Fürstner (1833–1908), German publisher
- Alois Fürstner (b. 1962), Austrian chemist
- Karl Fürstner (1848–1906), German neurologist and psychiatrist
- Johan Furstner (1887–1970), Dutch naval officer and politician
- Stephan Fürstner (b. 1987), German professional footballer
- Wolfgang Fürstner (1896–1936), German Army officer
