= Mécanisme de la physionomie humaine =

Mécanisme de la physionomie humaine. ou, Analyse électro-physiologique de l'expression des passions des arts plastiques. is a monograph on the muscles of facial expression, researched and written by Guillaume-Benjamin-Amand Duchenne de Boulogne (1806–75). It first appeared as an abstract published in Archives générales de médecine in 1862 and was then published in three formats: two octavo editions and one quarto edition. The work was an important resource used by Charles Darwin (1809–82) for his own study on the genetics of behaviour, titled The Expression of the Emotions in Man and Animals, and in recent years it has been reclaimed as an important landmark in the history of the photographic arts.

== Overview ==
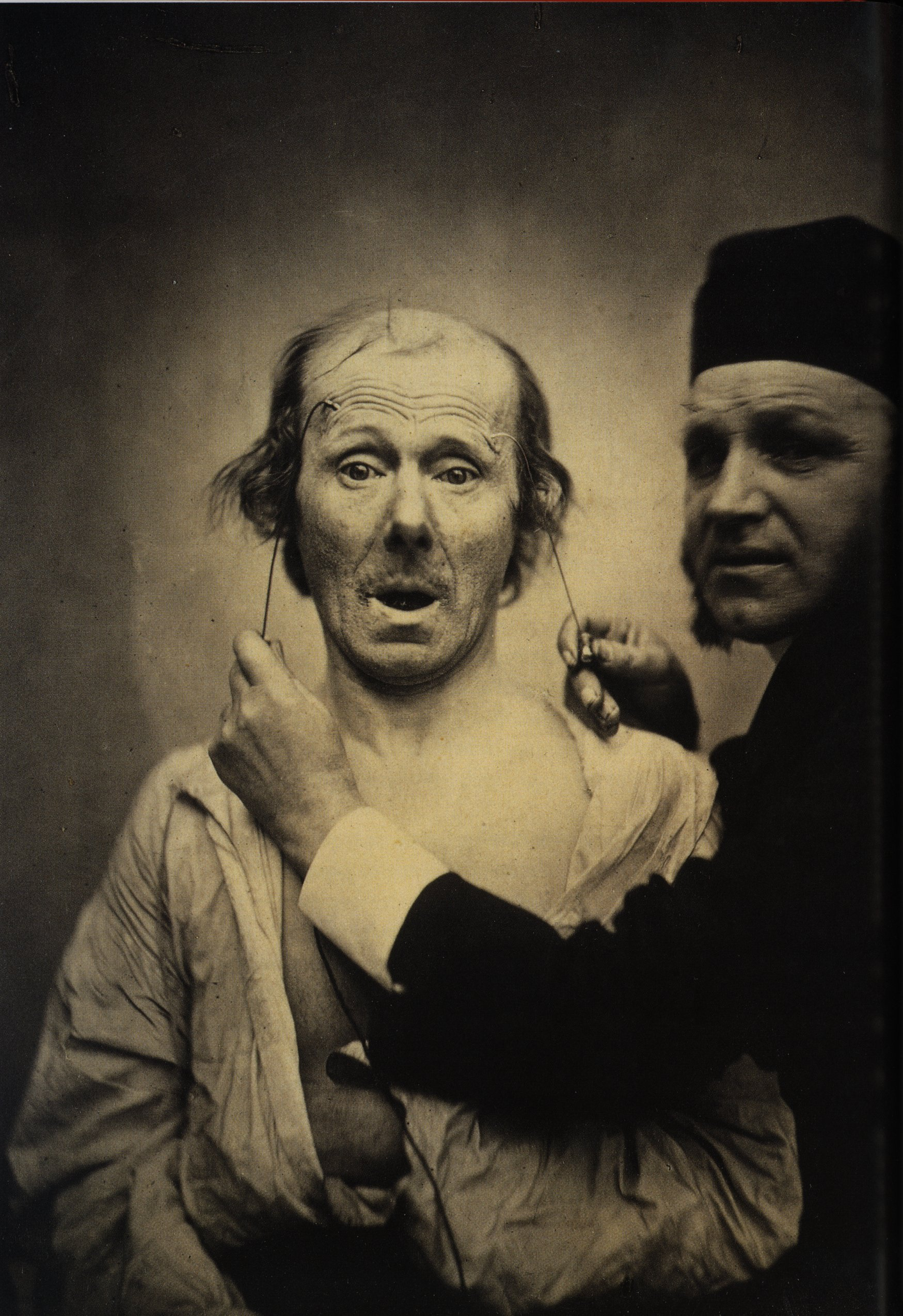
Duchenne and his patient, an "old toothless man, with a thin face, whose features, without being absolutely ugly, approached ordinary triviality"

Influenced by the fashionable beliefs of Physiognomy of the 19th century, Duchenne wanted to determine how the muscles in the human face produce facial expressions which he believed to be directly linked to the soul of man. He is known, in particular, for the way he triggered muscular contractions with electrical probes, recording the resulting distorted and often grotesque expressions with the recently invented camera. He published his findings during 1862, together with extraordinary photographs of the induced expressions, in the book The Mechanism of Human Physiognomy (Mécanisme de la physionomie humaine).

Like physiognomists and phrenologists before him, Duchenne believed that the human face was a map the features of which could be codified into universal taxonomies of inner states; he was convinced that the expressions of the human face were a gateway to the soul of man. Unlike Lavater and other physiognomists of the era, Duchenne was skeptical of the face's ability to express moral character; rather he was convinced that it was through a reading of the expressions alone (known as pathognomy) which could reveal an "accurate rendering of the soul's emotions". He believed that he could observe and capture an "idealized naturalism" in a similar (and even improved) way to that observed in Greek art. It is these notions that he sought conclusively and scientifically to chart by his experiments and photography and it led to the publishing of The Mechanism of Human Physiognomy during 1862 (also titled, The Electro-Physiological Analysis of the Expression of the Passions, Applicable to the Practice of the Plastic Arts. in French: Mécanisme de la physionomie humaine, ou Analyse électro-physiologique de l'expression des passions applicable à la pratique des arts plastiques). The work compromises a volume of text divided into three parts:

1. General considerations
2. A scientific section
3. An aesthetic section

These sections were accompanied by an atlas of photographic plates. Believing that he was investigating a God-given language of facial signs, Duchenne writes:

In the face our creator was not concerned with mechanical necessity. He was able in his wisdom or – please pardon this manner of speaking – in pursuing a divine fantasy … to put any particular muscles into action, one alone or several muscles together, when He wished the characteristic signs of the emotions, even the most fleeting, to be written briefly on man's face. Once this language of facial expression was created, it sufficed for Him to give all human beings the instinctive faculty of always expressing their sentiments by contracting the same muscles. This rendered the language universal and immutable

Duchenne defines the fundamental expressive gestures of the human face and associates each with a specific facial muscle or muscle group. He identifies thirteen primary emotions the expression of which is controlled by one or two muscles. He also isolates the precise contractions that result in each expression and separates them into two categories: partial and combined. To stimulate the facial muscles and capture these "idealized" expressions of his patients, Duchenne applied faradic shock through electrified metal probes pressed upon the surface of the various muscles of the face.

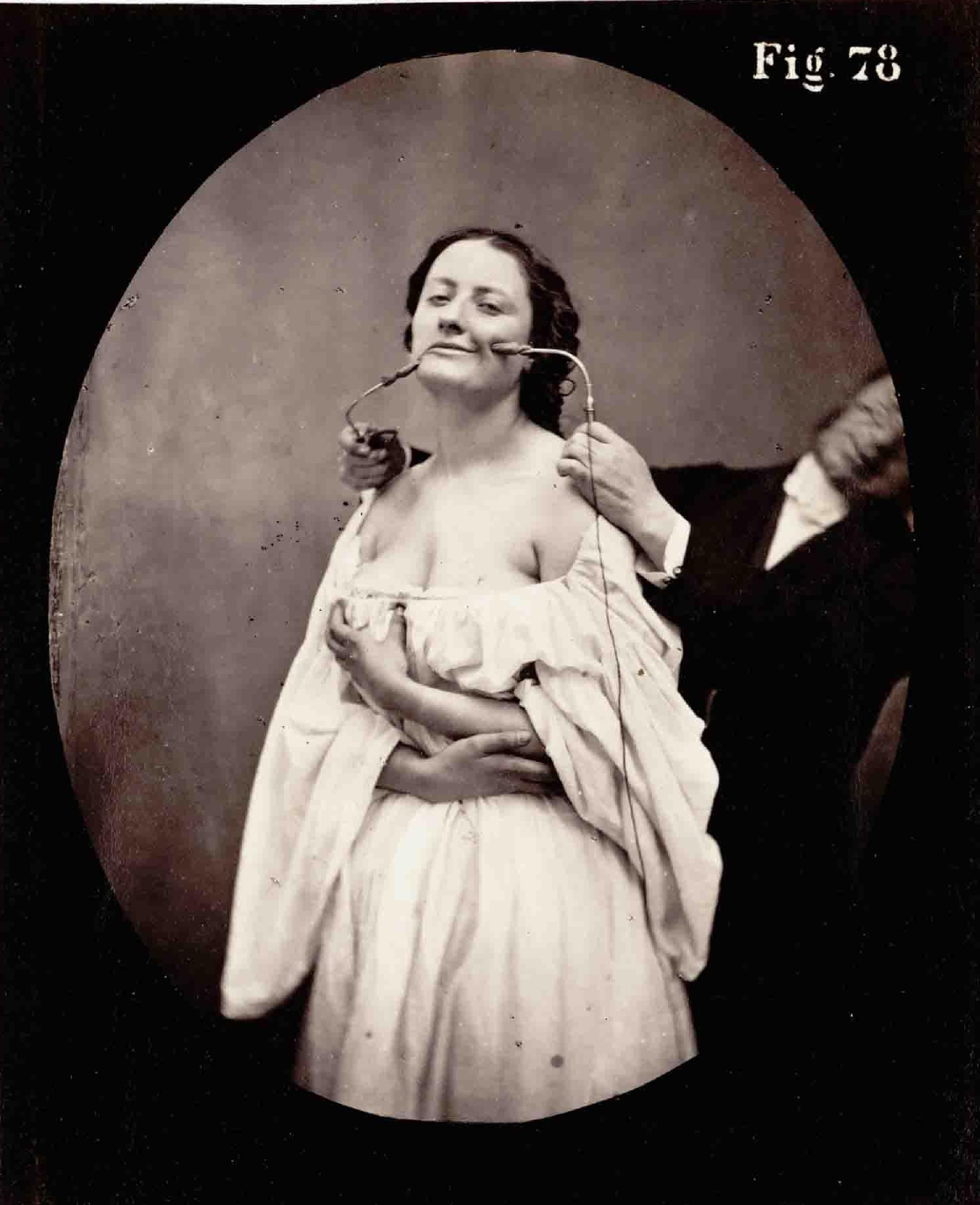
Duchenne patient, photo from Sorbonne University

Duchenne was convinced that the "truth" of his pathognomic experiments could only be effectively rendered by photography, the subject's expressions being too fleeting to be drawn or painted. "Only photography," he writes, "as truthful as a mirror, could attain such desirable perfection". He worked with a talented, young photographer, Adrian Tournachon, (the brother of Felix Nadar), and also taught himself the art in order to document his experiments. From an art-historical point of view, the Mechanism of Human Physiognomy was the first publication on the expression of human emotions to be illustrated with actual photographs. Photography had only been invented recently, and there was a widespread belief that this was a medium that could capture the "truth" of any situation in a way that other mediums were unable to do.

Duchenne used six living models in the scientific section, all but one of whom were his patients. His primary model, however, was an "old toothless man, with a thin face, whose features, without being absolutely ugly, approached ordinary triviality". Through his experiments, Duchenne sought to capture the very "conditions that aesthetically constitute beauty". He reiterated this in the aesthetic section of the book where he spoke of his desire to portray the "conditions of beauty: beauty of form associated with the exactness of the facial expression, pose and gesture". Duchenne referred to these facial expressions as the "gymnastics of the soul". He replied to criticisms of his use of the old man by arguing that "every face could become spiritually beautiful through the accurate rendering of his or her emotions", and furthermore said that because the patient was suffering from an anesthetic condition of the face, he could experiment upon the muscles of his face without causing him pain.

== Aesthetics and narrative setting ==
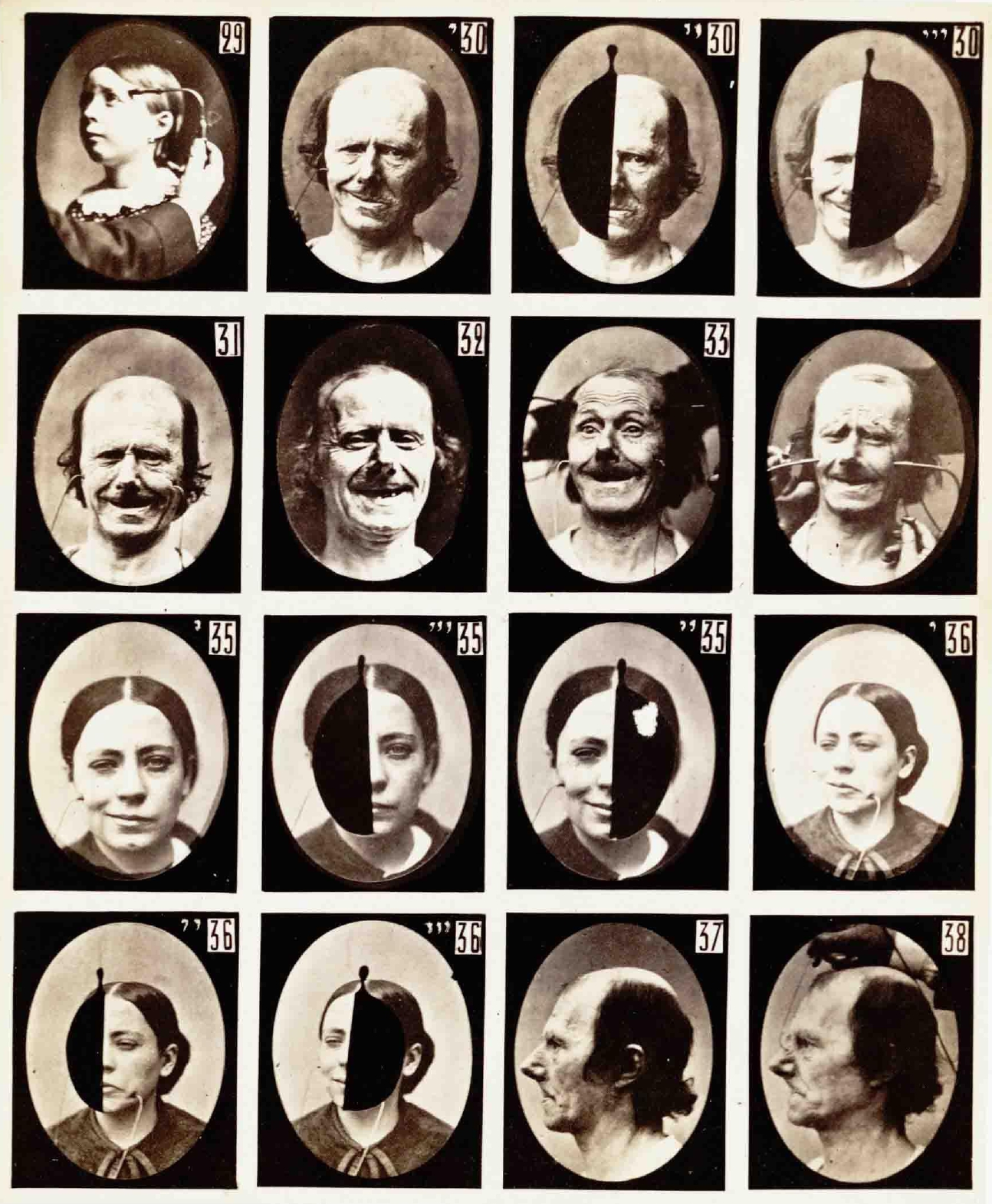
G.-B. Duchanne de Boulogne, Synoptic plate 4 from Le Mécanisme de la Physionomie Humaine. 1862, albumen print. In the upper row and the lower two rows, patients with different expressions on either side of their faces

Whereas the scientific section was intended to exhibit the expressive lines of the face and the "truth of the expression", the aesthetic section was intended also to demonstrate that the "gesture and the pose together contribute to the expression; the trunk and the limbs must be photographed with as much care as the face so as to form an harmonious whole". For these plates Duchenne used a partially blind young woman who he claimed "had become accustomed to the unpleasant sensation of this treatment …". As in many of the plates for the scientific section, this model was also stimulated faradically to provoke a different expression on either side of her face. Duchenne advised that looking at both sides of the face simultaneously would reveal only a "mere grimace" and he urged the reader to examine each side separately and with care.

Duchenne's experiments for the aesthetic section of the Mechanism included the use of performance and narratives which may well have been influenced by gestures and poses found in the pantomime of the period. He believed that only by electroshock and in the setting of elaborately constructed theatre pieces featuring gestures and accessory symbols could he faithfully depict the complex combinatory expressions resulting from conflicting emotions and ambivalent sentiments. These melodramatic tableaux include a nun in "extremely sorrowful prayer" experiencing "saintly transports of virginal purity"; a mother feeling both pain and joy while leaning over a child's crib; a bare-shouldered coquette looking at once offended, haughty and mocking; and three scenes from Lady Macbeth expressing the "aggressive and wicked passions of hatred, of jealousy, of cruel instincts", modulated to varying degrees of contrary feelings of filial piety. This theatre of pathognomic effect dominates the aesthetic section of the Mecanisme.

== Beauty and truth ==
To help him locate and identify the facial muscles, Duchenne drew heavily upon the work of Charles Bell, although he did not share the Scottish anatomist's interest in the expressions found in insanity. Duchenne may have avoided photographing the "passions" of the insane because of technical problems at the time; however, it is much more likely that he did so for aesthetic reasons – simply, that he did not regard the expressions of the insane as socially acceptable. Charles Bell's writings also showed an instinctive revulsion for the mentally ill.

The exact imitation of nature was for Duchenne the sine qua non of the finest art of whatever age, and although he praised the ancient Greek sculptors for unquestionably attaining an ideal of beauty, he nevertheless criticized them for their anatomical errors and failure to attend to the emotions. Thus at the end of the scientific section, for instance, Duchenne "corrects" the expressions of three widely revered classic Greek or Roman antiquities: In no manner, argues Duchenne, do any of these countenances conform to nature as revealed by his electrophysiological research. He even questions the Greek artist Praxiteles's accuracy in sculpting the Niobe:

Would Niobe have been less beautiful if the dreadful emotion of her spirit had bulged the head of her oblique eyebrow as nature does, and if a few lines of sorrow had furrowed the median section of her forehead? On the contrary, nothing is more moving and appealing than such an expression of pain on a young forehead, which is usually so serene.
