= Guillaume Duchenne de Boulogne =

French neurologist (1806–1875)

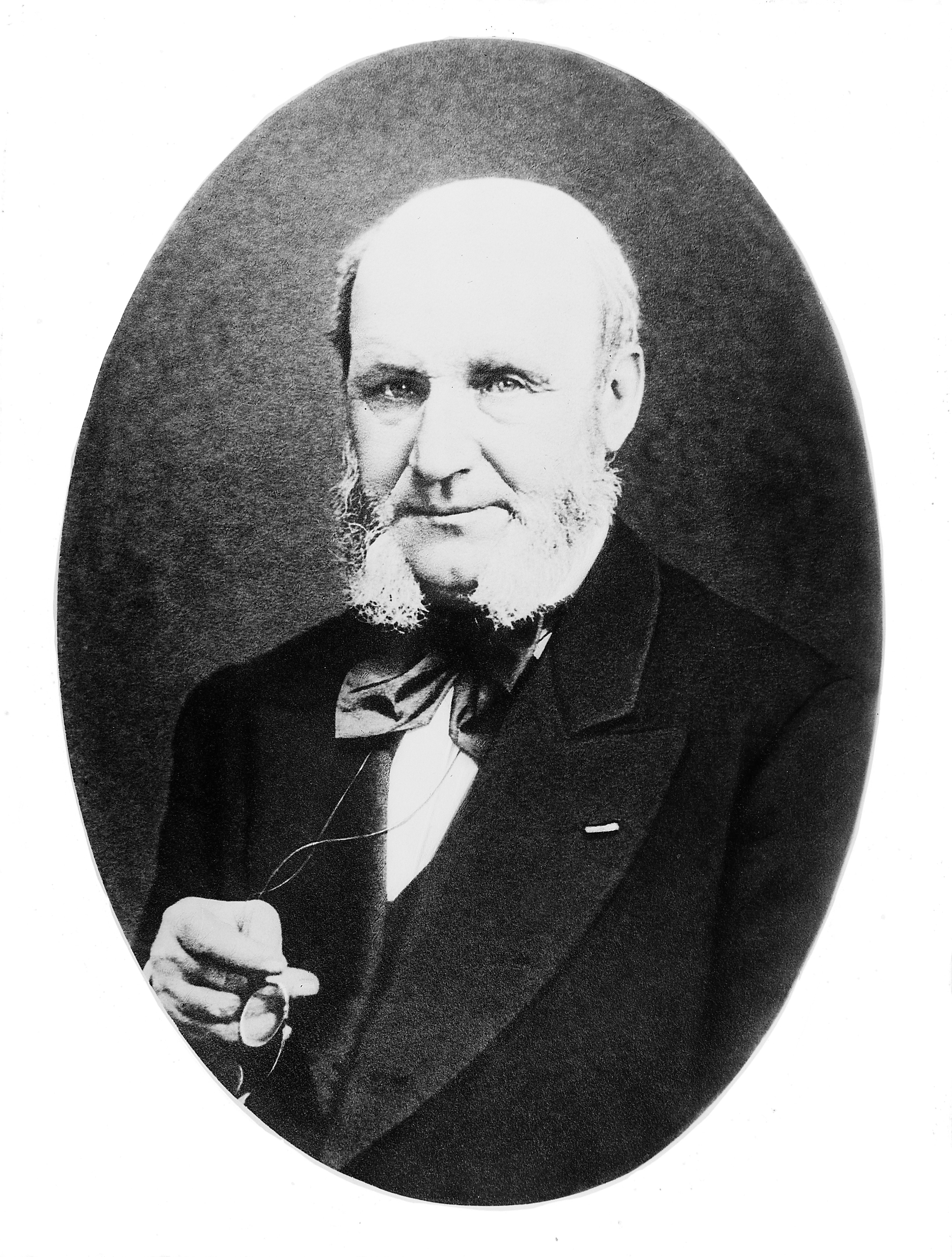
- Born: September 17, 1806; Boulogne, French Empire
- Died: September 15, 1875 (aged 68); Paris, France
- Known for: electrophysiology
- Scientific career
- Fields: neurology

Guillaume-Benjamin-Amand Duchenne (de Boulogne) (September 17, 1806, in Boulogne-sur-Mer – September 15, 1875, in Paris) was a French neurologist who revived Luigi Galvani's research and greatly advanced the science of electrophysiology. The era of modern neurology developed from Duchenne's understanding of neural pathways and his diagnostic innovations including deep tissue biopsy, nerve conduction tests (NCS), and clinical photography. This extraordinary range of activities (mostly in the Salpêtrière) was achieved against the background of a troubled personal life and a generally indifferent medical and scientific establishment.

Neurology did not exist in France before Duchenne and although many medical historians regard Jean-Martin Charcot as the father of the discipline, Charcot owed much to Duchenne, often acknowledging him as "mon maître en neurologie" (my master in neurology). The American neurologist Joseph Collins (1866–1950) wrote that Duchenne found neurology "a sprawling infant of unknown parentage which he succored to a lusty youth." His greatest contributions were made in the myopathies that came to immortalize his name, Duchenne muscular dystrophy, Duchenne-Aran spinal muscular atrophy, Duchenne-Erb paralysis, Duchenne's disease (Tabes dorsalis), and Duchenne's paralysis (progressive bulbar palsy). He was the first clinician to practise muscle biopsy, with an invention he called "l'emporte-pièce" (Duchenne's trocar). In 1855, he formalized the diagnostic principles of electrophysiology and introduced electrotherapy in a textbook titled De l'electrisation localisée et de son application à la physiologie, à la pathologie et à la thérapeutique. A companion atlas to this work, the Album de photographies pathologiques, was the first neurology text illustrated by photographs. Duchenne's monograph, the Mécanisme de la physionomie humaine – also illustrated prominently by his photographs – was the first study on the physiology of emotion and was highly influential on Darwin's work on human evolution and emotional expression.

== Biography ==
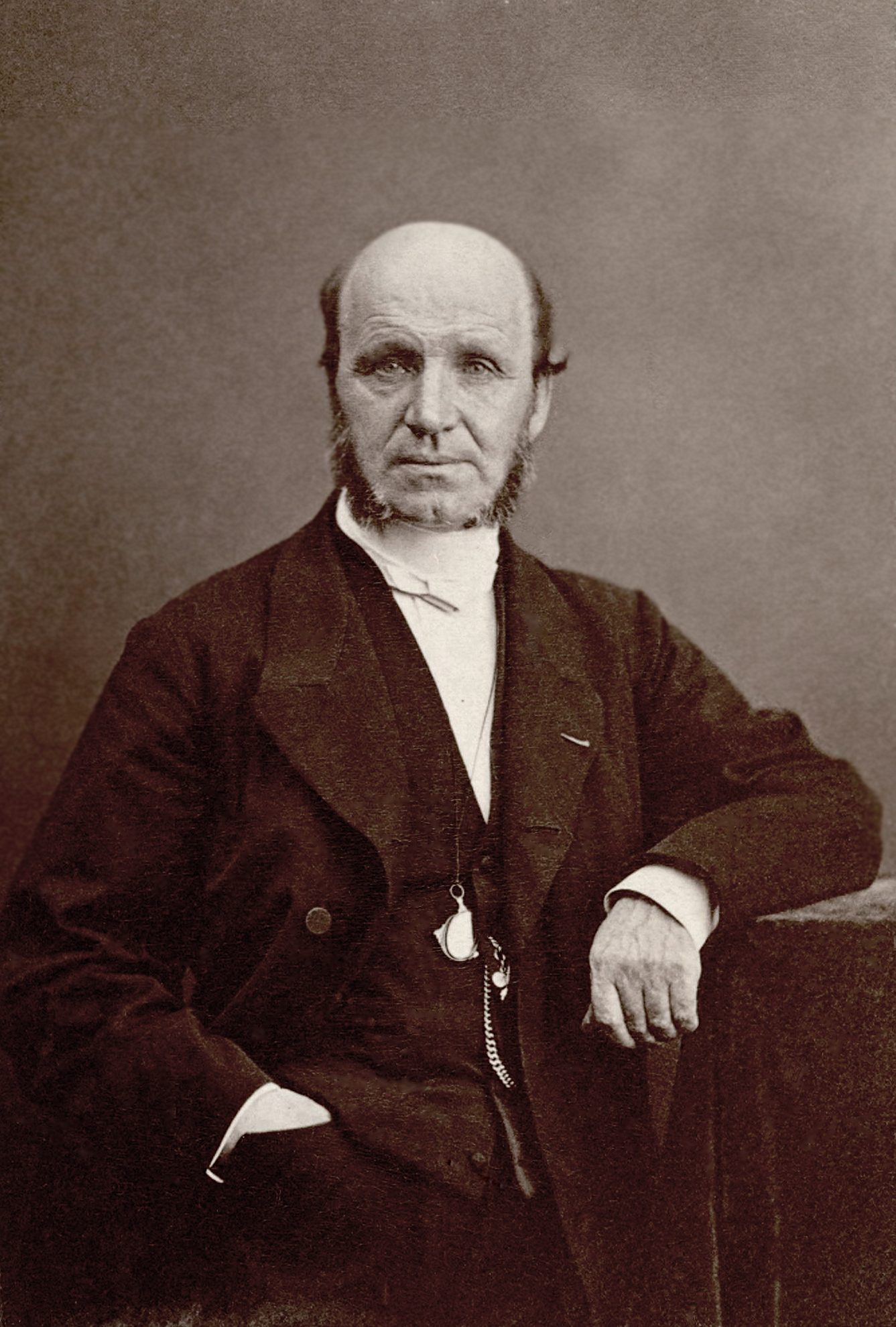
Albumen print archived at the National Library of Medicine in Bethesda. Duchenne's colleagues appended "de Boulogne" to his name to avoid confusion with the like-sounding name of Édouard-Adolphe Duchesne (1804–1869) who was a popular society physician in Paris.

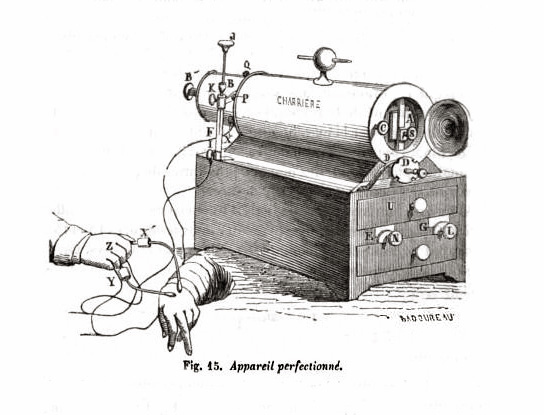
Woodcut illustration of Duchenne's "appareil volta-électrique."

Guillaume-Benjamin Duchenne descended from a long line of mariners who had settled in the Boulogne-sur-Mer region of France. In opposition to his father's wishes that he become a sailor, and driven by a fascination with science, Duchenne enrolled at the University of Douai where he received his Baccalauréat at the age of 19. He then trained under a number of distinguished Paris physicians including René-Théophile-Hyacinthe Laënnec (1781–1826) and Baron Guillaume Dupuytren (1777–1835) before returning to Boulogne and setting up in practice there. Duchenne married a local woman, and, following the birth of their son, his wife died. This resulted in a lengthy period of personal difficulties for Duchenne with his family and in a prolonged estrangement from his son (who later followed Duchenne into medical practice) and they were only reunited towards the end of his life.

In 1835, Duchenne began experimenting with therapeutic "électropuncture" (a technique recently invented by François Magendie and Jean-Baptiste Sarlandière by which electric shock was administered beneath the skin with sharp electrodes to stimulate the muscles). After a brief second marriage, Duchenne returned to Paris in 1842 in order to continue his medical research. Here, he did not achieve a senior hospital appointment, but supported himself with a small private medical practice, while daily visiting a number of teaching hospitals, including the Salpêtrière psychiatric centre. He developed a non-invasive technique of muscle stimulation that used faradic shock on the surface of the skin, which he called "électrisation localisée" and he published these experiments in his work, On Localized Electrization and its Application to Pathology and Therapy, first published in 1855. A pictorial supplement to the second edition, Album of Pathological Photographs (Album de Photographies Pathologiques) was published in 1862. A few months later, the first edition of his now much-discussed work, The Mechanism of Human Physiognomy, was published. Were it not for this small, but remarkable, work, his next publication, the result of nearly 20 years of study, Duchenne's Physiology of Movements, his most important contribution to medical science, might well have gone unnoticed.

Despite his unorthodox procedures, and his often uneasy relations with the senior medical staff with whom he worked, Duchenne's single-mindedness obtained him an international standing as a neurologist and researcher. He is counted as one of the developers of electro-physiology and electro-therapeutics, and he also showed that smiles resulting from true happiness not only utilize the muscles of the mouth but also those of the eyes: such "genuine" smiles are known as Duchenne smiles in his honor. He is also credited with the discovery of Duchenne muscular dystrophy. Duchenne died in 1875, after several years of illness. He was never elected to the French Academy of Sciences nor did he belong to a French university.

== The Mechanism of Human Facial Expression ==
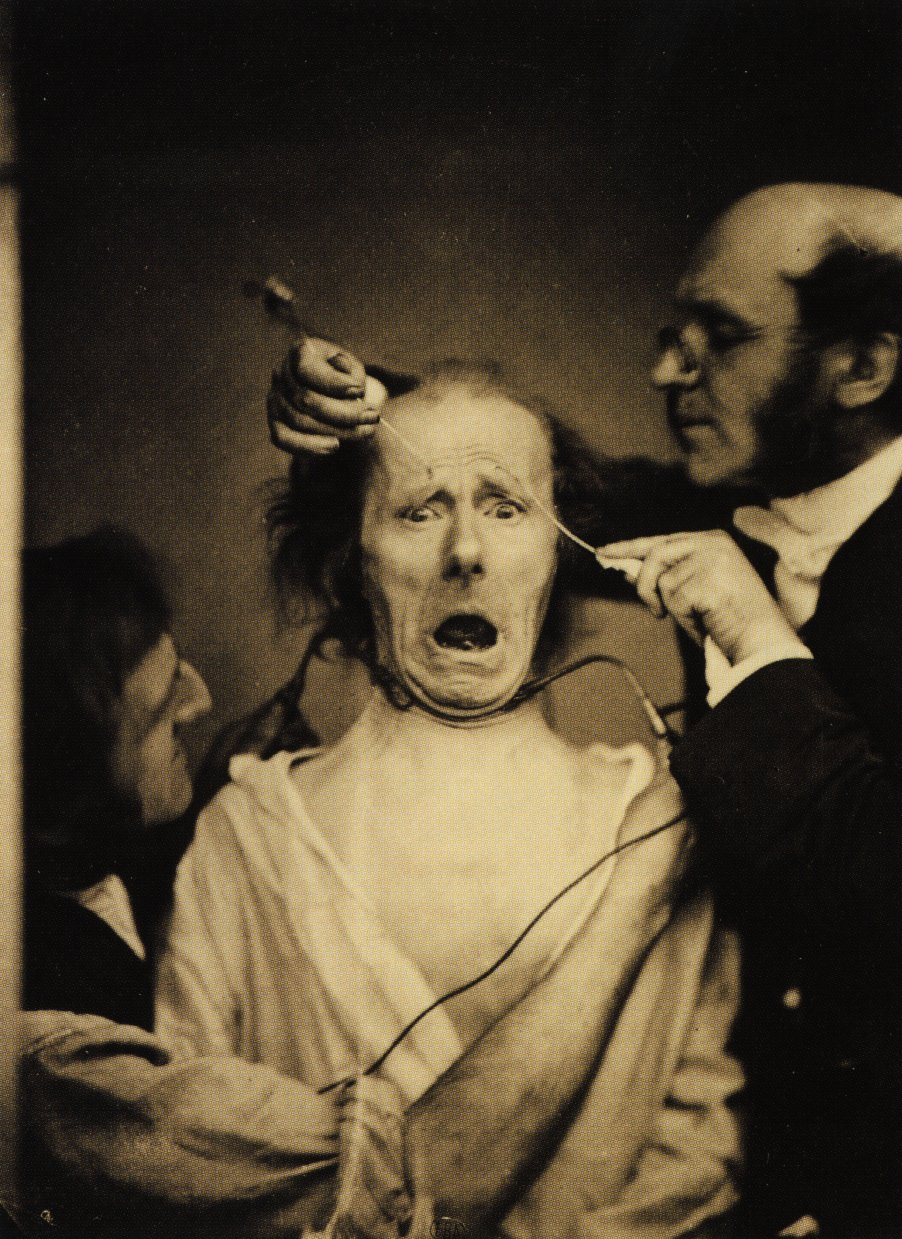
Demonstration of the mechanics of facial expression. Duchenne and an assistant faradize the mimetic muscles of "The Old Man."

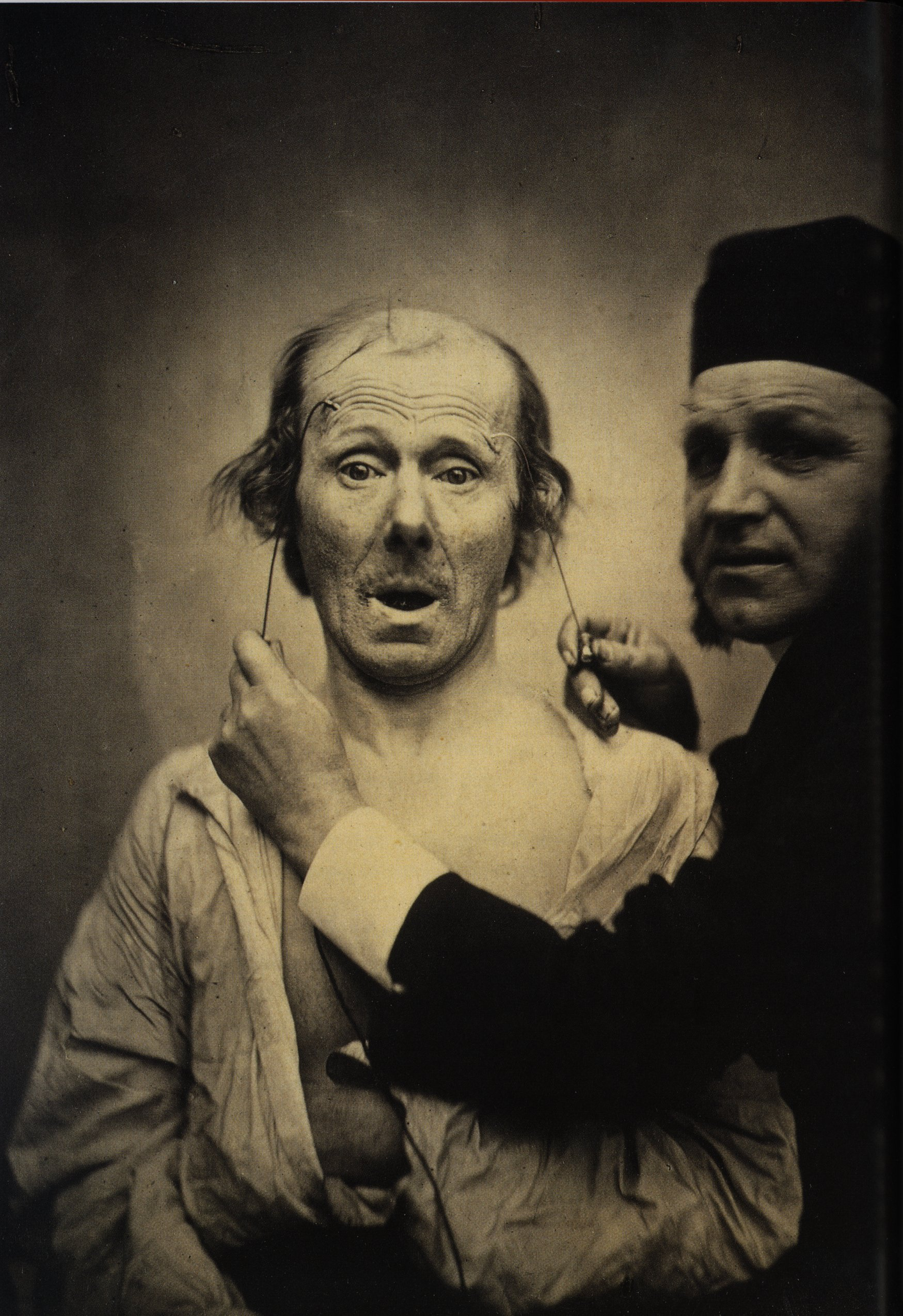
Duchenne and his patient, an "old toothless man, with a thin face, whose features, without being absolutely ugly, approached ordinary triviality"

Influenced by the fashionable beliefs of physiognomy of the 19th century, Duchenne wanted to determine how the muscles in the human face produce facial expressions which he believed to be directly linked to the soul of man. He is known, in particular, for the way he triggered muscular contractions with electrical probes, recording the resulting distorted and often grotesque expressions with the recently invented camera. He published his findings in 1862, together with extraordinary photographs of the induced expressions, in the book Mecanisme de la physionomie Humaine (The Mechanism of Human Facial Expression, also known as The Mechanism of Human Physiognomy).

Duchenne believed that the human face was a kind of map, the features of which could be codified into universal taxonomies of mental states; he was convinced that the expressions of the human face were a gateway to the soul of man. Unlike Lavater and other physiognomists of the era, Duchenne was skeptical of the face's ability to express moral character; rather he was convinced that it was through a reading of the expressions alone (known as pathognomy) which could reveal an "accurate rendering of the soul's emotions". He believed that he could observe and capture an "idealized naturalism" in a similar (and even improved) way to that observed in Greek art. It is these notions that he sought conclusively and scientifically to chart by his experiments and photography and it led to the publishing of The Mechanism of Human Physiognomy in 1862 (also entitled, The Electro-Physiological Analysis of the Expression of the Passions, Applicable to the Practice of the Plastic Arts. in French: Mécanisme de la physionomie humaine, ou Analyse électro-physiologique de l'expression des passions applicable à la pratique des arts plastiques), now generally rendered as The Mechanism of Human Facial Expression. The work compromises a volume of text divided into three parts:

1. General Considerations,
2. A Scientific Section, and
3. An Aesthetic Section.

These sections were accompanied by an atlas of photographic plates. Believing that he was investigating a God-given language of facial signs, Duchenne writes:

In the face our creator was not concerned with mechanical necessity. He was able in his wisdom or – please pardon this manner of speaking – in pursuing a divine fantasy … to put any particular muscles into action, one alone or several muscles together, when He wished the characteristic signs of the emotions, even the most fleeting, to be written briefly on man's face. Once this language of facial expression was created, it sufficed for Him to give all human beings the instinctive faculty of always expressing their sentiments by contracting the same muscles. This rendered the language universal and immutable.

Duchenne defines the fundamental expressive gestures of the human face and associates each with a specific facial muscle or muscle group. He identifies thirteen primary emotions the expression of which is controlled by one or two muscles. He also isolates the precise contractions that result in each expression and separates them into two categories: partial and combined. To stimulate the facial muscles and capture these "idealized" expressions of his patients, Duchenne applied faradic shock through electrified metal probes pressed upon the surface of the various muscles of the face.

Duchenne was convinced that the truth of his pathognomic experiments could only be effectively rendered by photography, the subject's expressions being too fleeting to be drawn or painted. "Only photography," he writes, "as truthful as a mirror, could attain such desirable perfection." He worked with a talented, young photographer, Adrien Tournachon, (the brother of Felix Nadar), and also taught himself the art in order to document his experiments. From an art-historical point of view, the Mechanism of Human Physiognomy was the first publication on the expression of human emotions to be illustrated with actual photographs. Photography had only recently been invented, and there was a widespread belief that this was a medium that could capture the truth of any situation in a way that other mediums were unable to do.

Duchenne used six living models in the scientific section, all but one of whom were his patients. His primary model, however, was an "old toothless man, with a thin face, whose features, without being absolutely ugly, approached ordinary triviality." Through his experiments, Duchenne sought to capture the very "conditions that aesthetically constitute beauty." He reiterated this in the aesthetic section of the book where he spoke of his desire to portray the "conditions of beauty: beauty of form associated with the exactness of the facial expression, pose and gesture." Duchenne referred to these facial expressions as the "gymnastics of the soul". He replied to criticisms of his use of the old man by arguing that "every face could become spiritually beautiful through the accurate rendering of his or her emotions", and furthermore said that because the patient was suffering from an anesthetic condition of the face, he could experiment upon the muscles of his face without causing him pain.

=== Aesthetics and the narrative setting ===
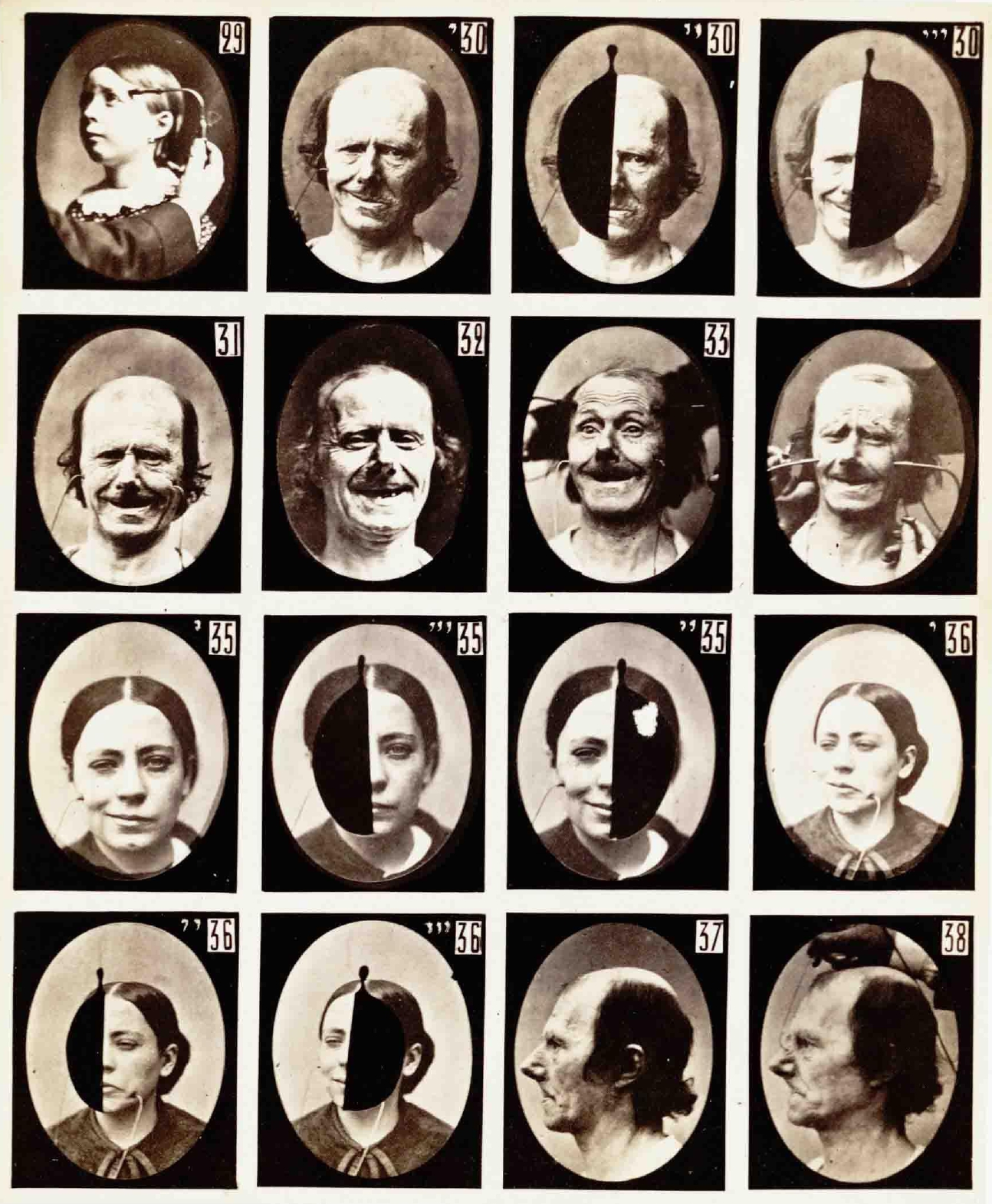
G.-B. Duchenne de Boulogne, Synoptic plate 4 from Le Mécanisme de la Physionomie Humaine. 1862, albumen print. In the upper row and the lower two rows, patients with different expressions on either side of their faces

Whereas the scientific section was intended to exhibit the expressive lines of the face and the "truth of the expression," the aesthetic section was intended also to demonstrate that the "gesture and the pose together contribute to the expression; the trunk and the limbs must be photographed with as much care as the face so as to form an harmonious whole." For these plates Duchenne used a partially blind young woman who he claimed "had become accustomed to the unpleasant sensation of this treatment …". As in many of the plates for the scientific section, this model was also stimulated faradically to provoke a different expression on either side of her face. Duchenne advised that looking at both sides of the face simultaneously would reveal only a "mere grimace" and he urged the reader to examine each side separately and with care.

Duchenne's experiments for the aesthetic section of the Mechanism included the use of performance and narratives which may well have been influenced by gestures and poses found in the pantomime of the period. He believed that only by electroshock and in the setting of elaborately constructed theatre pieces featuring gestures and accessory symbols could he faithfully depict the complex combinatory expressions resulting from conflicting emotions and ambivalent sentiments. These melodramatic tableaux include a nun in "extremely sorrowful prayer" experiencing "saintly transports of virginal purity"; a mother feeling both pain and joy while leaning over a child's crib; a bare-shouldered coquette looking at once offended, haughty and mocking; and three scenes from Lady Macbeth expressing the "aggressive and wicked passions of hatred, of jealousy, of cruel instincts," modulated to varying degrees of contrary feelings of filial piety. This theatre of pathognomic effect dominates the aesthetic section of the Mecanisme.

=== Beauty and truth ===
To help him locate and identify the facial muscles, Duchenne drew heavily upon the work of Charles Bell, who had included psychiatric patients in his studies. Duchenne may have avoided photographing the "passions" of the insane because of technical problems at the time; however, it is more likely that he did so for aesthetic reasons – that he did not regard the expressions of the insane as socially acceptable. Charles Bell's writings also showed an instinctive distaste for the mentally ill.

The exact imitation of nature was for Duchenne the sine qua non of the finest art of whatever age, and although he praised the ancient Greek sculptors for unquestionably attaining an ideal of beauty, he nevertheless criticized them for their anatomical errors and failure to attend to the emotions. Thus at the end of the scientific section, for instance, Duchenne "corrects" the expressions of three widely revered classic Greek or Roman antiquities: In no manner, argues Duchenne, do any of these countenances conform to nature as revealed by his electrophysiological research. He even questions the Greek artist Praxiteles's accuracy in sculpting the Niobe:

Would Niobe have been less beautiful if the dreadful emotion of her spirit had bulged the head of her oblique eyebrow as nature does, and if a few lines of sorrow had furrowed the median section of her forehead? On the contrary, nothing is more moving and appealing than such an expression of pain on a young forehead, which is usually so serene.

== Duchenne's influence ==
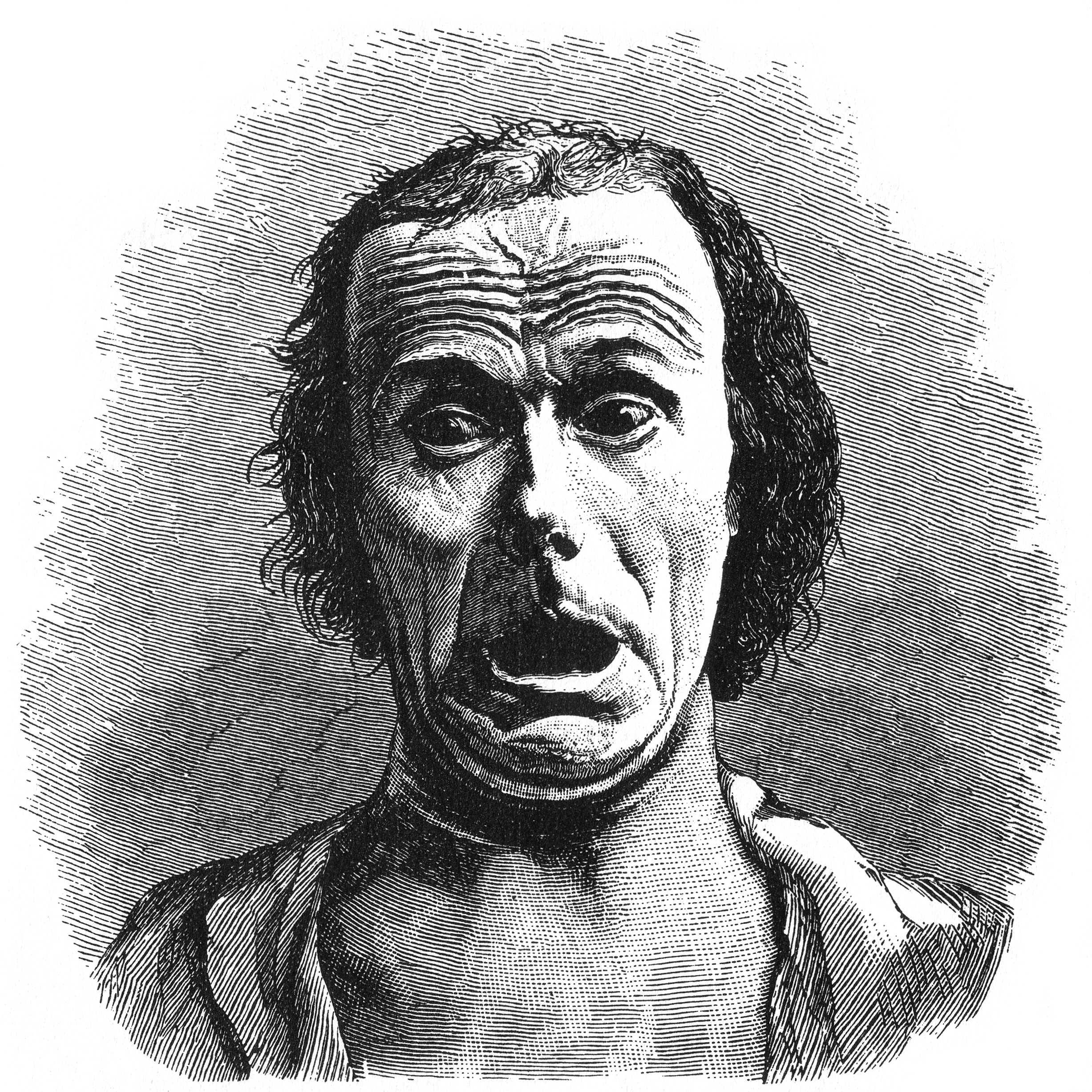
Figure 20 from Charles Darwin's The Expression of the Emotions in Man and Animals (1872). Caption reads "FIG. 20.—Terror, from a photograph by Dr. Duchenne"

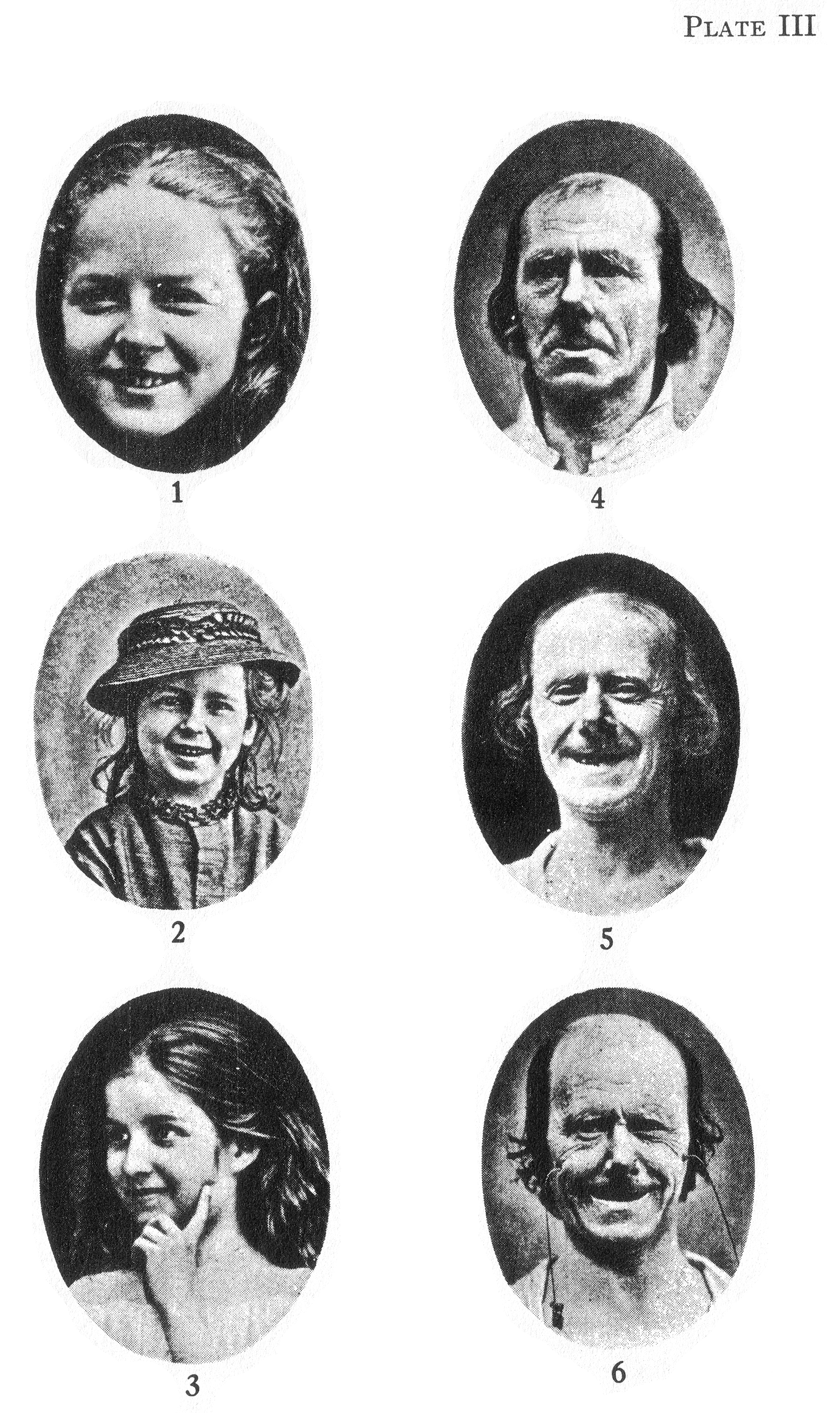
Plate III from Charles Darwin's The Expression of the Emotions in Man and Animals. From Chapter VIII: Joy—High spirits—Love—Tender feelings—Devotion

Darwin's The Expression of the Emotions in Man and Animals written, in part, as a refutation of Sir Charles Bell's theologically doctrinaire physiognomy, was published in 1872. This book elaborated on Darwin's theory of evolution by natural selection and concentrated on the genetic aspects of human behaviour. Darwin's text carried illustrations drawn from Duchenne's photographs, and Darwin and Duchenne corresponded briefly. It is noteworthy, also, that Darwin lent his copy of Duchenne's book to the British psychiatrist James Crichton-Browne in 1869, that Crichton-Browne seems to have mislaid the book for a year or so (in the West Riding lunatic asylum in Wakefield, Yorkshire - see the Darwin Correspondence Project, Letter 7220) and that - in 1872 - Crichton-Browne invited Sir David Ferrier to his asylum laboratory to undertake experiments involving the electrical stimulation of motor centres in the brain.

Duchenne's most famous student was Jean-Martin Charcot, who became director of the insane asylum at the Salpêtrière in 1862. He adopted Duchenne's procedure of photographic experiments and also believed that it was possible to attain the truth through direct observation. He even named an examination room at the asylum after his teacher. Like Duchenne, Charcot sought to chart the gestures and expressions of his patients, believing them to be subject to absolute, mechanistic laws. However, unlike Duchenne, who restricted his experiments to the realm of the sane, Charcot was interested almost exclusively in photographing the expressions of traumatized patients - the "hysterics". He is also known for enabling the public to witness these emotional displays by establishing his renowned weekly "theatre of the passions" for the fashionable society of the day to witness the expressions of the insane. This provided much inspiration for popular culture, including the Grand Guignol theatre which opened in 1897, and to which Alfred Binet made numerous contributions. Sigmund Freud, who attended Charcot's clinical demonstrations in 1885, laid out the foundations of his life's work, psychoanalysis, with a sympathetic deconstruction of Charcot's neurological lectures on hypnosis and hysteria.

In 1981, a modern audience was exposed to Duchenne's The Mechanism of Human Physiognomy when the book and its photographs were revealed - alongside illustrations of phrenology and evolutionary theory - on screen in the film version of John Fowles's novel, The French Lieutenant's Woman. There, the protagonist, Charles Smithson, a young scientist, who "like most men of his time, was still faintly under the influence of the Lavater's Physiognomy," is intent on interpreting an alienated woman's true character from her expressions.

Perhaps we can best understand Duchenne's contribution to art and science by Robert Sobieszek's concluding words to his comprehensive chapter on Duchenne, in his book Ghost in the Shell where he writes:

Duchenne's ultimate legacy may be that he set the stage, as it were, for Charcot's visual theater of the passions and defined the essential dramaturgy of all the visual theaters, both scientific and artistic, that have since been conceived in the attempt to picture our psyches. … In the end, Duchenne's Mecanisme de la Physionomie Humaine and the photographic stills from its experimental theater of electroshock excitations established the modern field on which the struggle to depict and thus discern the ever-elusive meanings of our coded faces continues even now to be waged.

== Eponymous diseases ==
- Duchenne muscular dystrophy
- Erb-Duchenne palsy
- Duchenne-Aran disease

== Works ==
- Essai sur la brûlure (1833)
- De l'Électrisation localisée et de son application à la physiologie, à la pathologie et à la thérapeutique (1855)
- Paraplegie hypertrophique de l'enfance de cause cerebrale (1861)
- Mécanisme de la physionomie humaine, ou Analyse électro-physiologique de l'expression des passions applicable à la pratique des arts plastiques (1862)
- Physiologie des mouvements démontrée à l'aide de l'expérimentation électrique et de l'observation clinique, et applicable à l'étude des paralysies et des déformations (1867)

== See also ==
- A Clinical Lesson at the Salpêtrière – 1887 group tableau portrait by André Brouillet
