= Karl Friedrich Otto Westphal =

German psychiatrist (1833–1890)

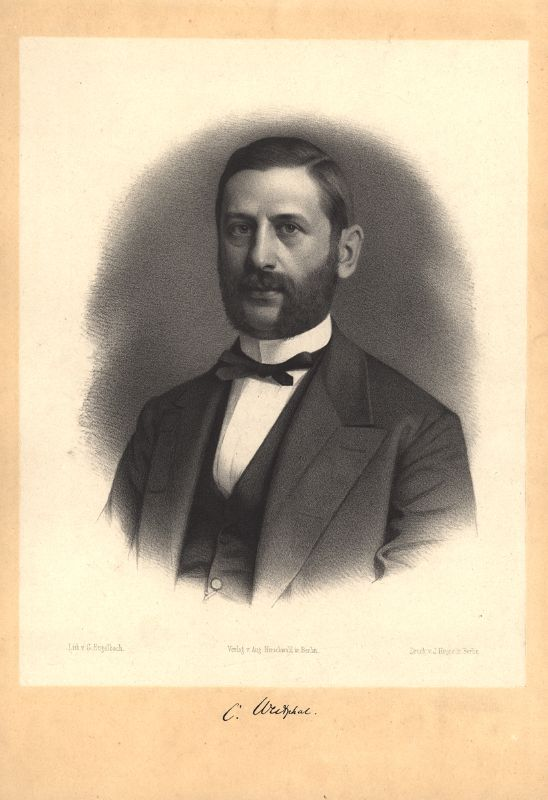

Karl Friedrich Otto Westphal (23 March 1833 – 27 January 1890) was a German psychiatrist from Berlin. He was the son of Otto Carl Friedrich Westphal (1800–1879) and Karoline Friederike Heine and the father of Alexander Karl Otto Westphal (1863–1941). He was married to Klara, daughter of the banker Alexander Mendelssohn. Westphal died in Kreuzlingen in 1890.

== Academic career ==
After receiving his doctorate, he worked at the Berlin Charité, and subsequently became an assistant in the department for the mentally ill under Wilhelm Griesinger (1817–1868) and Karl Wilhelm Ideler (1795–1860). In 1869 he became an associate professor of psychiatry, as well as a clinical instructor in the department for mental and nervous diseases, In 1874 he attained the title of full professor of psychiatry.

== Achievements in medicine ==
Westphal's contributions to medical science are many; in 1871 he coined the term agoraphobia when he observed that three male patients of his displayed extreme anxiety and feelings of dread when they had to enter certain public areas of the city. He is credited with providing an early diagnosis of pseudosclerosis, a disease known today as hepatolenticular degeneration. He also demonstrated a relationship between tabes dorsalis (nerve degeneration in the spinal cord) and paralysis in the mentally insane.

Westphal is credited with describing a deep tendon reflex anomaly in tabes dorsalis that later became known as the "Erb–Westphal symptom" (named with neurologist Wilhelm Heinrich Erb (1840–1921). His name is also shared with neurologist Ludwig Edinger (1855–1918) regarding the Edinger–Westphal nucleus, which is an accessory nucleus of the oculomotor nerve (cranial nerve number III; CN III). He was the first physician to provide a clinical description of narcolepsy and cataplexy (1877). French physician Jean-Baptiste-Édouard Gélineau (1828–1906), also described the two maladies, coining the term narcolepsie in 1880.

A large portion of his written work dealt with diseases of the spinal cord and neuropathological issues. He trained a number of prominent neurologists and neuropathologists, including Arnold Pick, Hermann Oppenheim, Karl Fürstner, Carl Moeli and Karl Wernicke. His son, Alexander Karl Otto Westphal (1863–1941) was also a psychiatrist, and is associated with the Westphal–Piltz syndrome (neurotonic pupillary reaction). Westphal, in addition to his multiple contributions to neurology and neuroanatomy, has been credited with introducing rational and non-censorious treatment to psychiatric hospitalization in Germany.

Michel Foucault credits Westphal for the birth of the modern homosexual, with his paper published in 1870 on "contrary sexual feeling", in which he describes two people dealing with what would later come to be known as homosexuality. This appears to be one of the first medical accounts of sexuality as a psychiatric disorder.

== Additional eponyms ==
- "Westphal–Leyden ataxia": Acute ataxia that begins in childhood. Named with Ernst Viktor von Leyden (1832–1910).
- "Westphal's sign": The clinical correlate of the absence or decrease of patellar reflex or knee jerk.
- "Westphal's syndrome": A familial form of intermittent hypocalcaemic paralysis.

== Selected writings ==
- Die Konträre Sexualempfindung: Symptom eines neuropathologischen (psychopathischen) Zustandes in: Archiv für Psychiatrie und Nervenkrankheiten, Berlin, 1869–70; 2: 73–108.
- Die Agoraphobie, eine neuropathische Erscheinung. Archiv für Psychiatrie und Nervenkrankheiten, Berlin, 1871–72; 3: 138–161.
- Ueber einige durch mechanische Einwirkung auf Sehnen und Muskeln hervorgebrachte Bewegungs-Erscheinungen (Knie-, Fussphänomen). Archiv für Psychiatrie und Nervenkrankheiten, Berlin, 1875,5: 803–834.
- Eigentümliche mit Einschlafen verbundene Anfälle. Archiv für Psychiatrie und Nervenkrankheiten, Berlin, 1877; 7: 631–635. (described Westphal-Leyden ataxia).
- Über eine dem Bilde der cerebrospinalen grauen Degeneration ähnliche Erkrankung des centralen Nervensystems ohne anatomischen Befund, nebst einigen Bemerkungen über paradoxe Contraction. Archiv für Psychiatrie und Nervenkrankheiten, 1883, 14: 87–134. (described Westphal's sign and Westphal–Strümpell pseudosclerosis).
- Über einen merkwürdigen Fall von periodischer Lähmung aller vier Extremitäten mit gleichzeitigem Erlöschen der elektrischen Erregbarkeit während der Lähmung. Berliner Klinische Wochenschrift, 1885,22: 489–491, 509–511. (described Westphal's syndrome).

== Translations ==
- Westphal, K. (2006). Contrary sexual instinct: Symptom of a neuropathic (psychopathic) Condition. (M. Lombardi-Nash, Trans.). Jacksonville, FL: Urania Manuscripts. (Original work published 1869)

== See also ==
- Westphal's sign
