= Duchenne =

Duchenne may refer to:

- Duchenne de Boulogne (1806–1875), a French physician who pioneered modern neurology
- Duchenne muscular dystrophy, a severe recessive X-chromosome linked form of muscular dystrophy
- Duchenne smile, a smile that involves certain facial muscles and is believed to indicate genuine happiness
