= Wolfgang Fürstner =

German Wehrmacht officer (1896–1936)

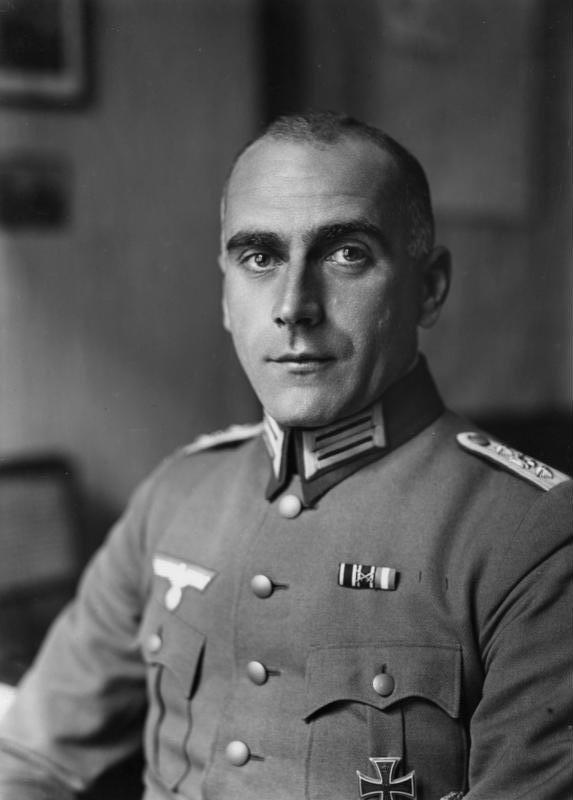
- First Class Iron Cross on Fürstner's breast pocket lower right.
- Born: 4 April 1896; German Empire
- Died: 19 August 1936 (aged 40); Berlin, Nazi Germany
- Burial place: Invalidenfriedhof Berlin
- Military career
- Allegiance: German Empire (to 1918); Weimar Republic (to 1933); Nazi Germany
- Branch: Heer (Army)
- Rank: Hauptmann (Captain)
- Conflicts: World War I
- Awards: Olympic Medal First Class; Iron Cross First Class

Wolfgang Fürstner (4 April 1896 – 19 August 1936) was a German Wehrmacht captain who was appointed as commander and later vice-commander of Berlin's Olympic village during the 1936 Summer Olympics.

== Family ==
Wolfgang Fürstner was married to Leonie von Schlick, the daughter of Marie Gräfin von Reventlow and Albert Heinrich Hans Karl von Schlick (1874–1957), the last commander of the World War I battlecruiser SMS Derfflinger.

== Career and replacement ==
After being tasked with building and organising the Olympic village, Fürstner was replaced by Lieutenant Colonel Werner Freiherr von und zu Gilsa in June 1936. Fürstner was demoted to local vice-commander. Officially, the demotion was because "Fürstner did not act with the necessary energy" since 370,000 visitors had poured through from the opening on 1 May to 15 June 1936 and caused damage. The explanation was a pretext to disparage Fürstner because of his background. Fürstner, along with fencer Helene Mayer and Ice hockey star Rudi Ball, was one of the few people with Jewish ancestry connected with the 1936 Olympics. The non-Jewish Werner von Gilsa was given Fürstner's position and promoted to General der Infanterie. Gilsa became the last Wehrmacht commandant of Dresden and committed suicide on 8 May 1945.

== Death and cover-up ==
Fürstner committed suicide with a pistol shot on 19 August 1936, three days after the end of the games. He had been awarded the Olympic Medal First Class and had attended a banquet for his successor, Gilsa, but Fürstner, a career officer, had learned that according to the Nuremberg Laws, he was classified as a Jew and was to be dismissed from the Wehrmacht. (His grandfather Dr. Karl Fürstner was a Jewish convert to Christianity.)

To cover up Fürstner's suicide and to protect the international reputation of Germany, the Nazis said that Fürstner had died from a car accident.

However, word of the cover up leaked out to foreign journalists, who reported that he had shot himself. For example, The Sydney Morning Herald in Australia reported he had been found dead with a gun by his side.

He was buried in the Invalidenfriedhof, section F, alongside the honoured dead of Germany's wars. The grave was listed in the Official Berlin Invalidenfriedhof Guidebook (Der Invalidenfriedhof in Berlin – Ein Ehrenhain preußisch-deutscher Geschichte), which appeared between 1936 and 1940 in several editions.

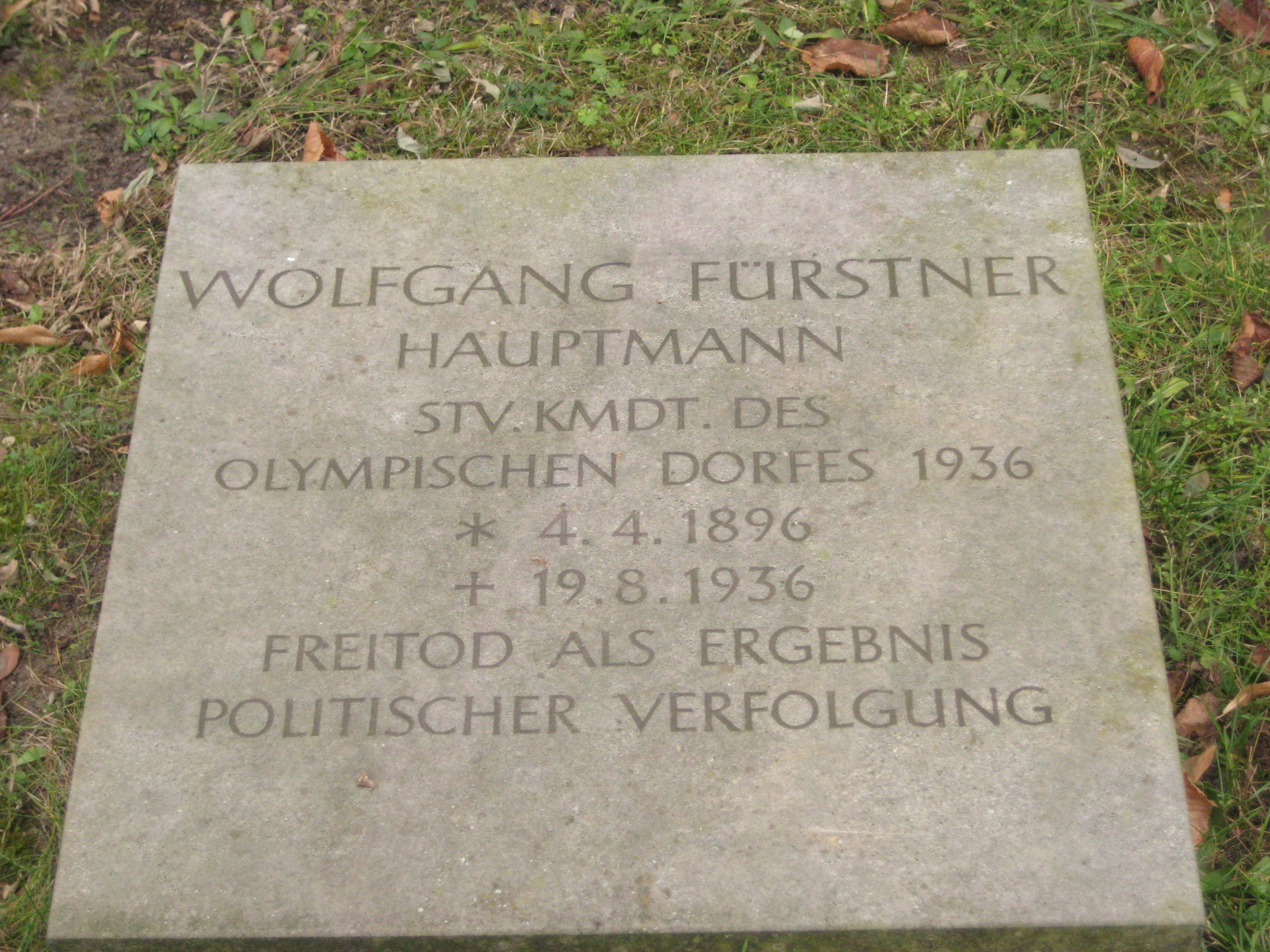
Wolfgang Fürstner's gravestone. "Suicide as a result of political persecution"

=== Restoration of grave ===
A new stone marker for Fürstner's grave was donated by the German Olympic Committee and dedicated in June 2002 by the Committee President, Walther Tröger. The stone lists Fürstner as "Deputy Commandant of the Olympic Village 1936" (stellvertretender Kommandant des Olympischen Dorfes 1936).

== Bibliography ==
- Lehrer, Steven (2002). Hitler Sites: A City-by-city Guidebook (Austria, Germany, France, United States). McFarland. p. 224. ISBN 0-7864-1045-0.
- Lehrer, Steven (2006). The Reich Chancellery and Führerbunker Complex: An Illustrated History of the Seat of the Nazi Regime. McFarland. p. 214. ISBN 0-7864-2393-5.
- Dost, Susanne. Das Olympische Dorf 1936 im Wandel der Zeit, Neddermeyer, Berlin 2003, ISBN 3-933254-12-4
