= Carl Moeli =

German neurologist and psychiatrist (1849–1919)

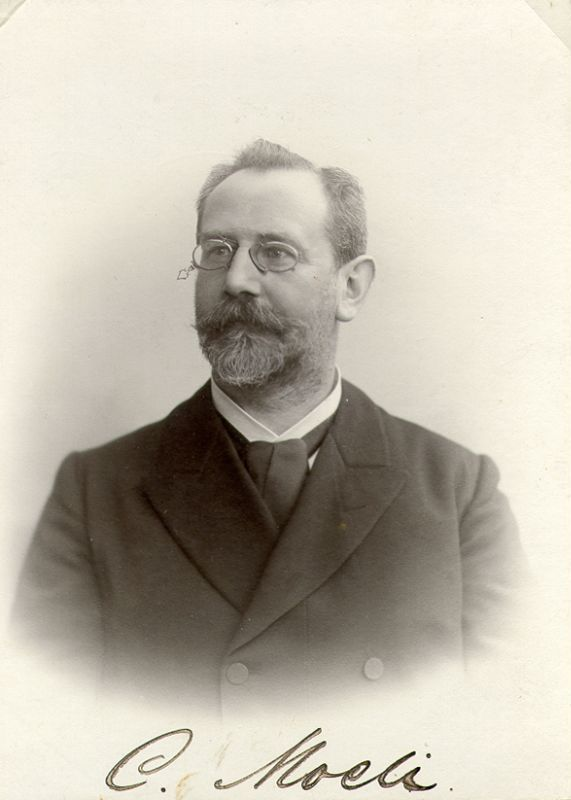
Carl Moeli (1849-1919)

Carl Franz Moeli (10 May 1849 – 4 November 1919) was a German neurologist and psychiatrist born in Kassel.

He studied medicine in Marburg, Würzburg and Leipzig followed by work as an assistant at clinics in Rostock and Munich. In 1880 he became an assistant to Karl Westphal (1833–1890) in the psychiatric clinic at the Berlin-Charité. At the Charité he performed anatomical studies of the optic nerve, research involving the pupillary reaction of mental patients, the effects of syphilis on the brain, and clinical studies of alcoholism. In 1883 he received his habilitation for psychiatry, and during the following year worked as an assistant medical director at the Städtische Irrenanstalt Dalldorf in Berlin.

In 1893 he became the first director of the newly built Irrenanstalt Herzberge, a position he maintained until 1914. Also he played an important role as adviser to the German government in regards to mental health issues. One of Moeli's better known assistants at Herzberge was neurologist Karl Birnbaum (1878–1950).

Moeli died on 4 November 1919 in Berlin.

He is best remembered for his work in forensic psychiatry. He performed extensive research involving the forensic relationship of alcoholism and alcoholic psychosis. He had particular interest in so-called "degenerative personalities" and associated psychoses.

== Written works ==
- Alcoholismus, psychische Störung; atrophische Lähmung der Extensoren am Oberschenkel. (Alcoholism, mental disorder, atrophic paralysis of the extensors of the thigh); Charité-Ann. 1881
- Eine Bemerkung zur Säufer-Epilepsie. (A note on "drunken-epilepsy"); Neurol. Centralbl. (1885)
- Ueber irre Verbrecher. I. Krankengeschichten. II. Ueber den Zusammenhang von Geistesstörung und Verbrechen. III. Ueber Feststellung des Geisteszustandes. IV. Die Simulation von Geisteskrankheit. V. Die Behandlung und Unterbringung irrer Verbrecher. Berlin, 1888
- Zur Erinnerung an Carl Westphal. Rede. (In memory of Carl Westphal. Speech). Berlin, 1890
- Behandlung der Vergiftungen mit Weingeist. (Treatment of alcohol poisoning) with handbook), d. spec. Therap. inner. Krankh. vol. 2. Jena, 1894
- Ueber psychische Schwäche in ihren verschiedenen Formen. (About mental weakness in its various forms); Preuss. Med.-Beamten-Ver. Off. Ber. 11, ss. 136-148 (1894)
- Weitere Mittheilungen über die Pupillen-Reaction. (Further communications about pupillary reaction); Berl. klin. Wchnschr. 34, ss. 373; 401 (1897)
- Demonstration des automatischen Excenter; Rotationsmikrotoms; Herzberge (Kaplan, Krefft, G. Meyer). Allgemeine Zeitschrift für Psychiatrie (1900)
- Ueber die vorübergehenden Zustände abnormen Bewustseins in Folge von Alkoholvergiftung und über deren forensische Bedeutung. Allgemeine Zeitschrift für Psychiatrie (1900)
- Die Fürsorge für Geisteskranke und geistig Abnorme, nach den gesetzlichen Vorschriften, Ministerial-Erlassungen, behördlichen Verordnungen und der Rechtsprechung, ein Handbuch für Ärzte und Verwaltungsbeamte. (The care for the mentally ill and the mentally abnormal, according to legal regulations, ministerial decrees, administrative regulations and case law, a manual for physicians and administrators); Halle a. S. 1915.
