= The Expression of the Emotions in Man and Animals =

1872 book by Charles Darwin

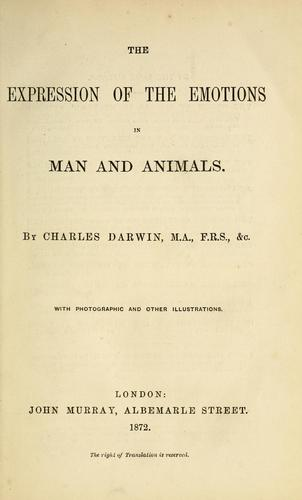
- Author: Charles Darwin
- Language: English
- Subject: Evolutionary theory, human behaviour
- Publisher: John Murray
- Publication date: 1872
- Publication place: United Kingdom

The Expression of the Emotions in Man and Animals is Charles Darwin's third major work of evolutionary theory, following On the Origin of Species (1859) and The Descent of Man, and Selection in Relation to Sex (1871). Initially intended as a chapter in Descent of Man, Expression grew in length and was published separately in 1872. Darwin explores the biological aspects of emotional behaviour and the animal origins of human characteristics like smiling and frowning, shrugging shoulders, the lifting of eyebrows in surprise, and the baring of teeth in an angry sneer.

Though Expression has never been out of print since its first publication, it has also been described as Darwin's "forgotten masterpiece". Psychologist Paul Ekman has argued that Expression is the foundational text for modern scientific psychology.

Before Darwin, human emotional life had posed problems to the traditional philosophical categories of mind and body. Darwin's interest in the subject can be traced to his time as an Edinburgh medical student and the 1824 edition of Anatomy and Philosophy of Expression by Charles Bell, which argued for a spiritual dimension to the subject. In contrast, Darwin's biological approach links human emotions to their origins in animal behaviour and allows cultural factors only an auxiliary role in shaping emotional expression. This biological emphasis highlights six different emotional states: happiness, sadness, fear, anger, surprise, and disgust. It also appreciates the universal nature of expression, implying a shared evolutionary heritage for the entire human species. Darwin also points to the importance of emotional communication with children in their psychological development.

Darwin sought out the opinions of some leading psychiatrists, notably James Crichton-Browne, in preparation for the book, which forms his main contribution to psychology.

The book's development involved several innovations: Darwin circulated a questionnaire during his preparatory research; he conducted simple psychology experiments on the recognition of emotions with his friends and family; and (like Duchenne de Boulogne, a physician at the Salpêtrière Hospital) he uses photography in his presentation of scientific information. Darwin's publisher warned him that including the photographs would "make a hole in the profits" of the book.

Expression is widely regarded as a landmark in the history of book illustration.

== The book's development: biographical aspects ==
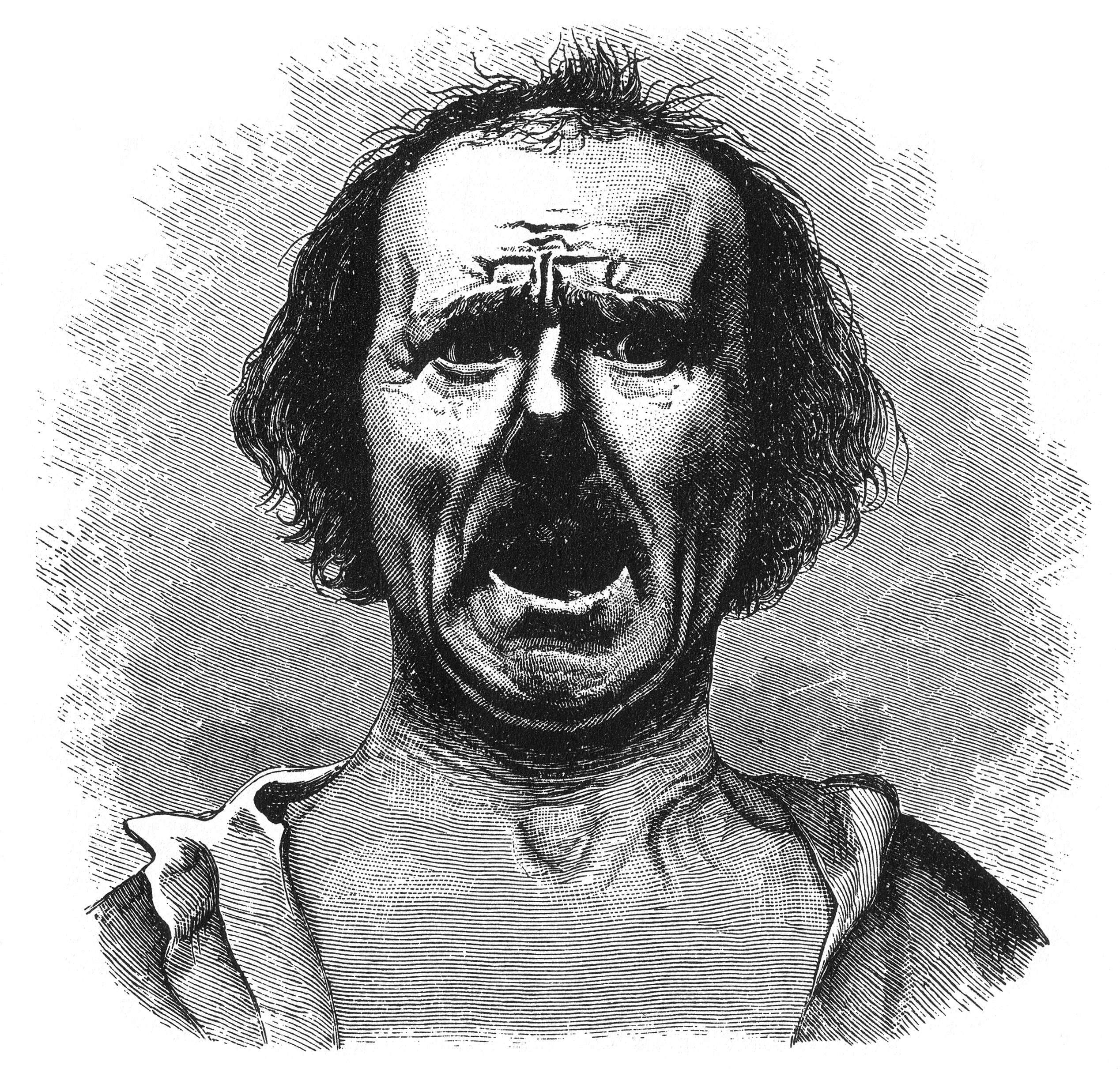
Figure 21, "Horror and Agony", from a photograph by Guillaume Duchenne de Boulogne (more images)

=== Background ===
In the weeks before Queen Victoria's coronation in 1838, Charles Darwin sought medical advice for his mysterious physical symptoms. He then travelled to Scotland for rest and a "geologising expedition" but also revisited the old haunts of his undergraduate days. On the day of the coronation, 28 June 1838, Darwin was in Edinburgh. Two weeks later, he opened a private notebook—Notebook M—for philosophical speculation, and, over the next three months, filled it with his ideas about hereditary influences on the psychological aspects of life. Darwin also made his first attempt at autobiography in August 1838.

Darwin fully grasped his conception of natural selection towards the end of September 1838, after encountering the sixth edition of the Essay on Population (1826) by Thomas Malthus. However, Malthus and his essay are strangely unmentioned in Notebook M, their acknowledgement delayed till October 1838 in Notebook N.

In Notebook M, Darwin describes conversations with his father—a successful doctor with a special interest in psychiatric problems—about recurring patterns of behavior in successive generations of his patients' families. Howard Gruber comments that these passages are suggestive concerning the genetics of emotions and thought, and there is an emphasis on the continuity between sane and insane.

Darwin was concerned about the materialistic drift in his thinking and the suspicions this might arouse in early Victorian England. At the time, he was mentally preparing for marriage with his cousin Emma Wedgwood, who held firm Christian beliefs. On 21 September 1838, Notebook M discloses a "confusing" dream where Darwin found himself involved in a public execution; the corpse had come to life and joked about not running away and facing death like a hero.

Darwin assembled the central features of his evolutionary theory while developing an appreciation of human behavior and family life; during this period, he was experiencing some emotional turmoil, largely expressed in physical symptoms.

A detailed discussion of the significance of Notebook M can be found in Paul H. Barrett's Metaphysics, Materialism and the Evolution of Mind – Early Writings of Charles Darwin (1980).

=== Development of the text in 1866–1872 ===
In its public management, Darwin understood that his evolutionary theory's relevance to human emotional life could provoke an anxious and hostile response.

While preparing the text of The Variation of Animals and Plants Under Domestication in 1866, Darwin began to explore topics related to human ancestry, sexual selection, and emotional life. After his initial correspondence with the psychiatrist James Crichton-Browne, Darwin set aside his material concerning emotional expression to complete Descent of Man, which covered human ancestry and sexual selection. He finished work on The Descent of Man on 15 January 1871. Two days later, he began work on The Expression of the Emotions in Man and Animals and completed most of the text within four months; progress then slowed because of work required on the sixth (and final) edition of The Origin of Species and a hostile review from St George Jackson Mivart. Darwin finished his work on the proofs on 22 August 1872.

Expression brings Darwin's evolutionary theory close to behavioural science, and several commentators have perceived a spectral Lamarckism within the text.

=== Universal nature of expression ===
In the book, Darwin notes the universal nature of expressions: "The young and the old of widely different races, both with man and animals, express the same state of mind by the same movements." This connection of mental states to the neurological organisation of movement, as suggested by the words motive and emotion, is central to Darwin's understanding of emotion.

Darwin displayed several biographical links between his psychological life and locomotion: taking long, solitary walks around Shrewsbury after his mother's death in 1817; in his seashore rambles near Edinburgh with the influential Lamarckian thinker Robert Edmond Grant in 1826 and 1827; and in laying out the sandwalk, his "thinking path", at Down House in Kent in 1846. These aspects of Darwin's personal life are discussed in the psychoanalytic biography Charles Darwin, A Biography (1990) by John Bowlby.

Darwin contrasts his notion of a shared human and animal ancestry with the ideas of Charles Bell which were aligned with natural theology. Bell claimed that facial muscles were designed to express uniquely human feelings. In the fifth edition of The Anatomy and Philosophy of Expression (1865), Bell stated: "Expression is to passion what language is to thought." In Expression, Darwin reformulates the issues at play: "The force of language is much aided by the expressive movements of the face and body", suggesting links between language and psychomotor function (body language).

=== Darwin's sources on emotional expression ===
Darwin attended debates about psychology at the Plinian Society in December 1826 and March 1827 as a medical student at Edinburgh University. These were prompted by the publication of Charles Bell's Anatomy and Philosophy of Expression (1824). In his presentations, the phrenologist William A.F. Browne ridiculed Bell's theological explanations, pointing instead to the similarities of human and animal biology. Both meetings ended in uproar. Darwin revisits these debates 45 years later and refers to Duchenne de Boulogne's Mécanisme de la physionomie humaine (1862) as he shifts the debate from philosophical to scientific discourse and highlights the social value of facial expression over other forms of expression in vocalisations, tears, and posture.

Darwin's response to Bell's natural theology is discussed in Lucy Hartley's Physiognomy and the Meaning of Expression in Nineteenth Century Culture (2001).

In the composition of the book, Darwin drew on a variety of sources:

- His questionnaire (circulated in the early months of 1867) concerning emotional expression in different ethnic groups
- Anthropological memories from his time on HMS Beagle
- Conversations with livestock breeders and pigeon fanciers
- Observations on his infant son William Erasmus Darwin (A Biographical Sketch of an Infant, published in 1877 in the philosophical journal Mind), on his family's dogs and cats, and on the orangutans at London Zoo
- Simple psychology experiments with members of his family concerning the recognition of emotional expression
- The neurological insights of Duchenne de Boulogne, a physician at the Salpêtrière asylum in Paris
- Hundreds of photographs of actors, babies, and children, including photographs by Oscar Rejlander
- Descriptions of psychiatric patients in West Riding Pauper Lunatic Asylum in Wakefield

Darwin distributed handwritten copies of his questionnaire in 1867, followed by a printed version in late 1867 or early 1868. Through his correspondence network, he sought observations from missionaries, merchants, and travellers to investigate whether emotional expressions were culturally learned or shared universally.

As a result of his domestic psychology experiments, Darwin reduced the number of commonly observed emotions from Duchenne's calculation of more than sixty facial expressions to six "core" expressions: anger, fear, surprise, disgust, happiness, and sadness.

Darwin corresponded with James Crichton-Browne, the son of the phrenologist William A. F. Browne and now the distinguished medical director of West Riding Pauper Lunatic Asylum. At the time, Crichton-Browne was editing The West Riding Lunatic Asylum Medical Reports. Recognising the significance of Crichton-Browne's contributions, Darwin suggested to him that Expression "ought to be called by Darwin and Browne?"

Darwin also drew on his personal experience of the symptoms of bereavement and studied the text of Henry Maudsley's 1870 Goulstonian Lectures on Body And Mind.

Darwin considered other approaches to the study of emotions, such as their depiction in the arts—as discussed by the actor Henry Siddons in his Practical Illustrations of Rhetorical Gesture and Action (1807) and by the anatomist Robert Knox in his Manual of Artistic Anatomy (1852)—but abandoned these approaches as unreliable.

It is noteworthy that only a few sections in Expression touch on emotional deception.

== Structure ==
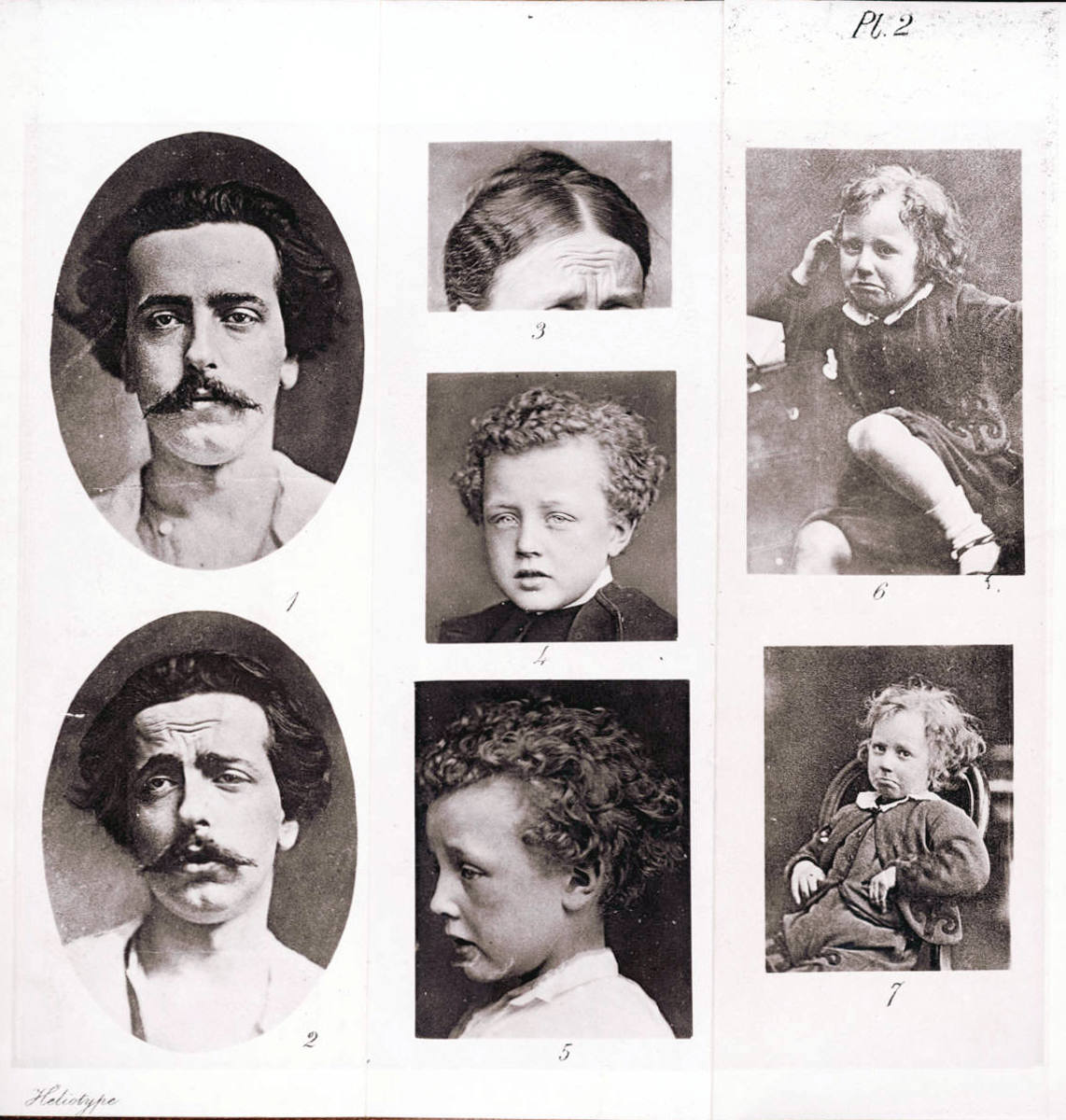
Illustration of grief from The Expression of the Emotions in Man and Animals

Expression opens with three chapters (1–3) entitled "General Principles of Expression", where Darwin introduces three principles:

1. "The principle of serviceable associated Habits" – describes how initially voluntary actions constitute complex expressions of emotion by association of habit.
2. "The principle of Antithesis" – explains how opposite mental states induce directly opposing movements.
3. "The principle of actions due to the constitution of the Nervous System, independently from the first of the Will, and independently to a certain extent of Habit" – discusses the interplay between physiological reactions (e.g., sweating, muscle trembling, blushing) and emotional experiences.

In the following chapters (4–6), Darwin presents his findings on modes of emotional expression peculiar to particular species, including humans.

Chapters 7–8 contain Darwin's observations on "low spirits" (anxiety, grief, dejection, and despair) and "high spirits" (joy, love, tender feelings, and devotion). Darwin claims that high spirits, exemplified by joy, find their purest expression in laughter.

Subsequent chapters (9–13) discuss various emotions and their expression. In his discussion of the emotion "disgust", Darwin notes its close links to the sense of smell and conjectures an association with offensive odours. In chapter 13 (which highlights the emotional states of self-attention, shame, shyness, modesty, and blushing), Darwin describes blushing as "the most peculiar and the most human of all expressions".

Darwin closes the book with chapter 14, where he summarises his central argument, showing how human emotions link mental states with bodily movement. He argues that these expressions are genetically determined and derive from purposeful actions observed in animals. He comments on the book's implications, proposing a single origin for the entire human species, with universal human expressions. Darwin emphasises the social value of expression, especially the emotional communication between mother and child.

== Illustrations ==
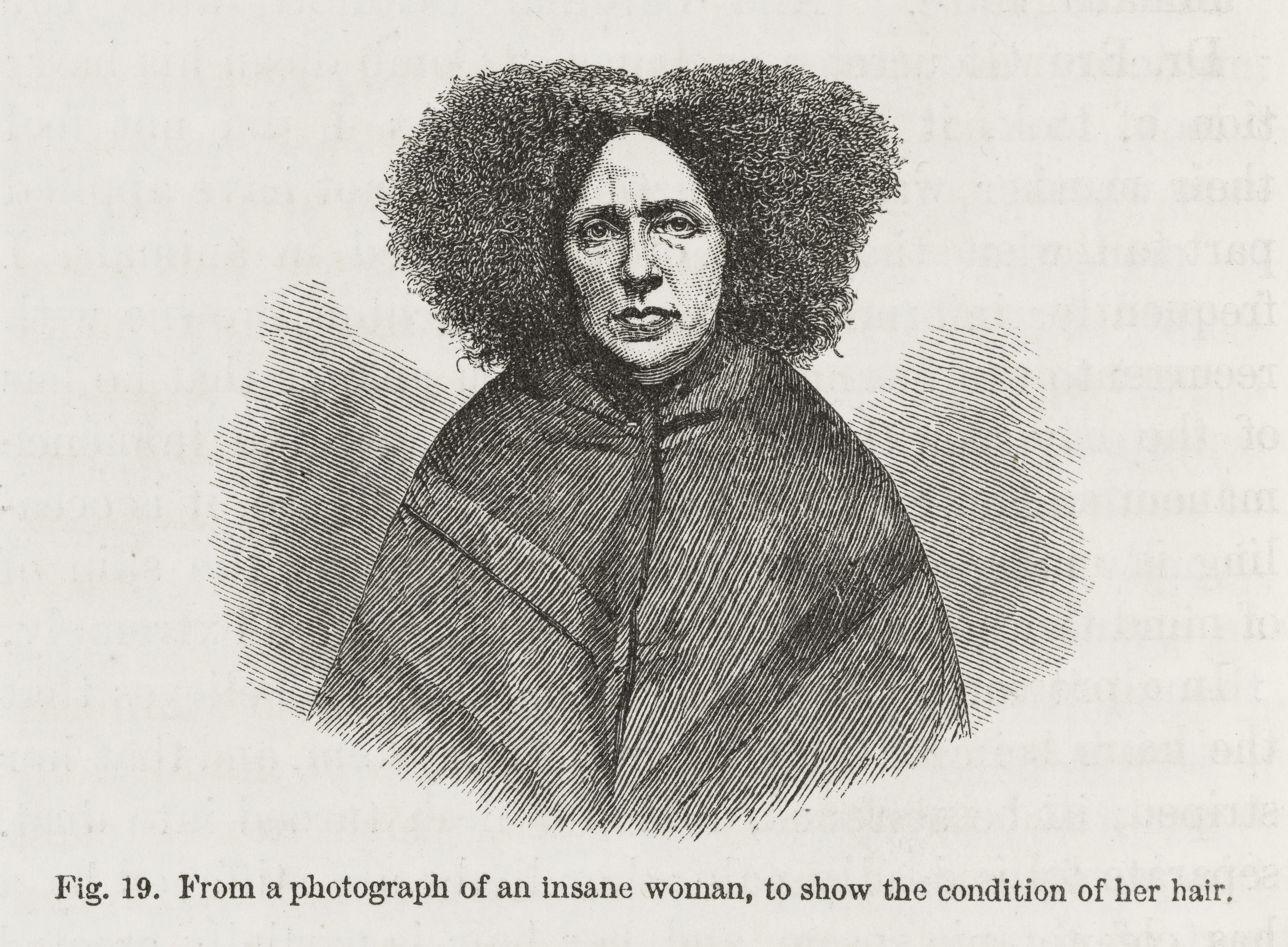
Figure 19: "From a photograph of an insane woman, to show the condition of her hair."

Because of the limited printing techniques of the 1800s, photographs were usually tipped into the pages of books. This process was expensive and labour-intensive since each photograph had to be printed and tipped in individually. Darwin proposed using heliotype to print the photographs to his publisher—John Murray—believing it would be cheaper. It allowed the illustrations to be bound directly with the pages of text, and the printing plates could be reused, which reduced costs.

The printers, Heliotype Company Limited, which Darwin chose for the photographs proved to be expensive. Robert F. Cooke, John Murray III's cousin and partner in his publishing company, expressed concern about the increasing production costs and warned Darwin that including the photographs "will make a terrible hole in the profits of each edition". Darwin proceeded with the printing process, and most of Expression was illustrated by photographic prints—with seven heliotype plates; figures 19–21 were printed using woodcuts.

The published book contains the work of several artists:

- Engravings of the Darwin family's domestic pets by the zoological illustrator T. W. Wood
- Drawings and sketches by Briton Rivière, A. May, and Joseph Wolf
- Portraits by the Swedish photographer Oscar Rejlander
- Anatomical diagrams by Charles Bell and Friedrich Henle
- Illustrative quotations from Mécanisme de la physionomie humaine (1862) by the French neurologist Duchenne de Boulogne (1806–1875).

Darwin received dozens of photographs of psychiatric patients from James Crichton-Browne but only included one—photoengraved by James Davis Cooper—titled "Figure 19". It depicts a patient under the care of Dr James Gilchrist at the Southern Counties Asylum in Dumfries.

== Publication ==
Darwin concluded work on the book with a sense of relief. The proofs, tackled by his daughter Henrietta ("Ettie") and son Leo, required a major revision, which made Darwin "sick of the subject and myself, and the world".

Expression was published by John Murray on 26 November 1872 as a sequel to The Descent of Man and was expected to reach a broad audience in mid-Victorian England. It quickly sold almost 7,000 copies.

A revised edition was published by Darwin's son in 1890, excluding several revisions suggested by Darwin; these were not published until the 1999 edition, edited by Paul Ekman.

A German translation of Expression appeared in 1872, and Dutch and French versions followed in 1873 and 1874.

== Reception ==
=== Contemporary ===
A review in the January 1873 Quarterly Journal of Science concluded that "although some parts are a little tedious, from the amount of minute detail required, there is throughout so much of acute observation and amusing anecdote as to render it perhaps more attractive to general readers than any of Mr. Darwin's previous work".

On 24 January 1895, James Crichton-Browne delivered a lecture "On Emotional Expression" in Dumfries, Scotland, presenting some of his reservations about Darwin's views. He argued for a greater role for the higher cortical centres in regulating emotional responses and discussed gender differences in emotional expression.

=== Modern ===
In a 1998 review of Expression, edited by Paul Ekman, Eric Korn argues in the London Review of Books that Margaret Mead and her followers had claimed and subverted the book before Ekman reinterpreted it. Korn notes that Ekman collected evidence supporting Darwin's views on the universality of human expression of emotions, indirectly challenging Mead's views. Korn challenges Ekman's calling Expression "Darwin's lost masterpiece", pointing out that the book has never been out of print since 1872.

The editors of the Mead Project website comment that Expression is among the most enduring contributions of 19th-century psychology and argue that although the book lays its foundation on an arguable interpretation of the nature of expression, its ideas continue to influence discussions on emotional experience. The editors cite John Dewey's comments on the book, writing that Darwin's arguments are "wrong but ... compelling".

In 2003, the New York Academy of Sciences published Emotions Inside Out: 130 Years after Darwin's The Expression of the Emotions in Man and Animals, a collection of 37 papers (edited by Paul Ekman) with recent research on the subject.

== Influence ==
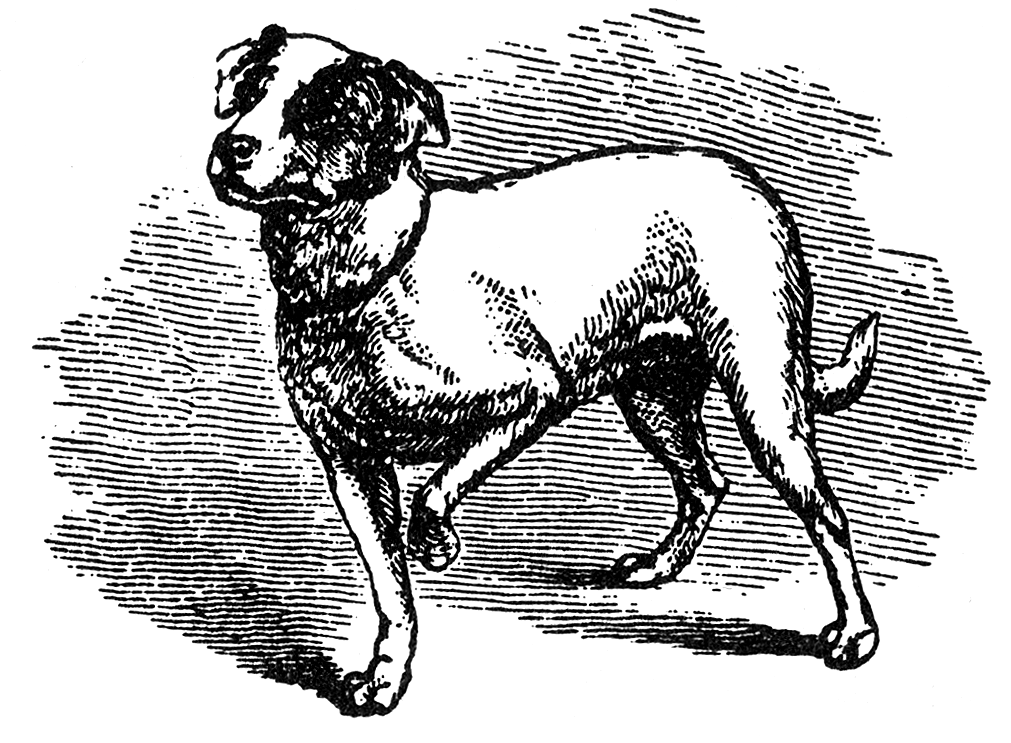
Figure 4: "A small dog watching a cat on a table", made from a photograph by Oscar Gustave Rejlander

=== Psychology ===
George Romanes (1848–1894), an advocate of Darwin's approach in comparative psychology, died prematurely, diminishing Darwin's impact on academic psychology. Darwin's impact was further compromised by Wilhelm Wundt's dimensional approach to the emotions and the widespread influence of behaviourism during the 20th century.

==== Psychoanalysis ====
Sigmund Freud's early publications on the symptoms of hysteria (with his influential concept of unconscious emotional conflict) acknowledged debts to Darwin's work on emotional expression.

All these sensations and innervations belong to the field of The Expression of the Emotions, which, as Darwin (1872) has taught us, consists of actions which originally had a meaning and served a purpose. These may now for the most part have become so much weakened that the expression of them in words seems to us to be only a figurative picture of them, whereas in all probability the description was once meant literally; and hysteria is right in restoring the original meaning of the words....

— Josef Breuer and Sigmund Freud, (1895) Studies on Hysteria

In 1905, Arthur Mitchell, a psychiatrist and former deputy to William A.F. Browne in the Scottish Lunacy Commission, published About Dreaming, Laughing and Blushing, (dedicated to Dr Joseph Bell), linking some of Darwin's concerns with those of dynamic psychology. Psychiatrist and psychoanalyst John Bowlby extensively references Darwin's ideas in his presentations on attachment theory.

Darwin's impact on psychoanalysis is discussed in detail by Lucille Ritvo in Darwin's Influence on Freud: A Tale of Two Sciences (1990).

==== Evolutionary psychology ====
William James followed up Darwin's ideas in his What Is An Emotion? (1884). In the James–Lange theory of emotions, James develops Darwin's emphasis on the physical aspects, including the autonomically mediated, visceral components of emotions.

In Bodily Changes in Pain, Hunger, Fear and Rage (1915) by Walter Cannon, Cannon introduces the phrase fight-or-flight response, formulating emotions in terms of strategies for interpersonal behaviour and showing how these emotions are amplified in groups or crowds—herd behavior. Psychological theories of emotion have also been set out in the Two-factor theory of emotion put forward by Schachter and Singer, the Papez–Maclean hypothesis, and the theory of constructed emotion.

Theories on somatic factors in personality were elaborated by psychiatrist Ernst Kretschmer; by the neurologist Paul Schilder, with his notion of body image in The Image and Appearance of the Human Body (1950); and in the concepts of somatotypology proposed by William Herbert Sheldon in the 1940s—now largely discredited. Zoologist Desmond Morris further explored the biological aspects of human emotions in his extensively illustrated scientific book Manwatching (1978), and recent research has confirmed that while cultural factors are critical to determining gestures, genetic factors are crucial to the formation of facial expressions.

=== Biological illustration ===
The comprehensive approach to biological illustration continued in contributions from various authors: photographer Eadweard Muybridge's work on animal locomotion, which influenced the development of cinematography; Scottish naturalist James Bell Pettigrew's studies on animal locomotion, documented in his works Animal Locomotion (1874) and Design in Nature (1908); the illustrated and controversial works of evolutionary biologist Ernst Haeckel; and, to a lesser extent, in On Growth and Form (1917) by D'Arcy Thompson.

== See also ==
- Affect display
- Body language
- Book illustration
- Charles Darwin's health
- Emotion and memory
- Emotional intelligence
- Emotions in animals
- Evolution of emotion
- Facial expression
- Nonverbal communication
- Posture (psychology)

== Sources ==
- Barrett, Paul (1980), Metaphysics, Materialism, & the Evolution of Mind: the early writings of Charles Darwin, Chicago: University of Chicago Press, ISBN 0-226-13659-0, "Early writings of Charles Darwin. With a commentary by Howard E. Gruber"
