= Tabes dorsalis =

Medical condition of late-stage neurosyphilis

- Other names: Syphilitic myelopathy
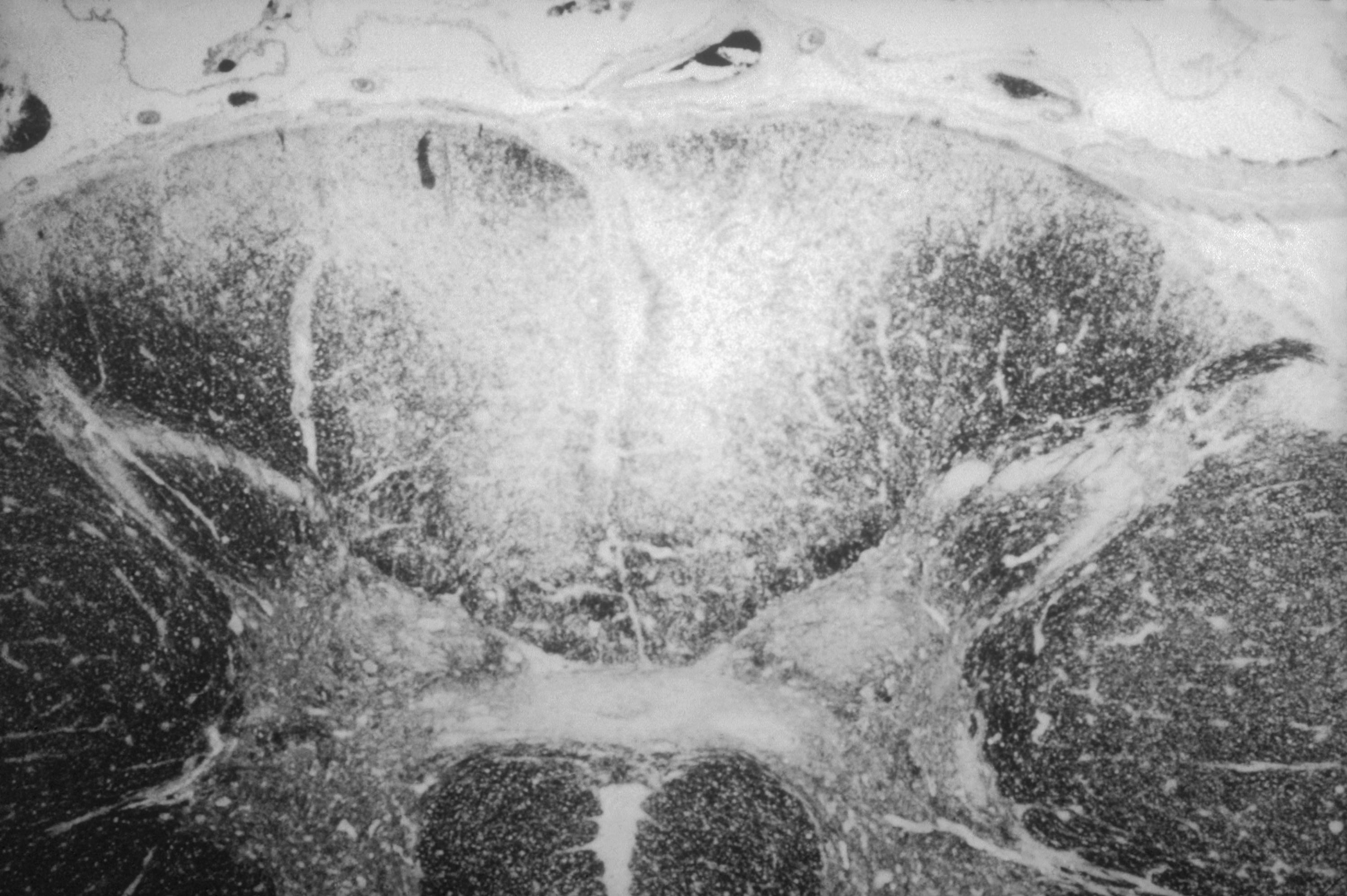
- Axial section of the spinal cord showing syphilitic destruction (whitened area, upper center) of the posterior columns which carry sensory information from the body to the brain
- Specialty: Neurology

Tabes dorsalis is a late consequence of neurosyphilis, characterized by the slow degeneration (specifically, demyelination) of the neural tracts primarily in the dorsal root ganglia of the spinal cord (nerve root). These patients have lancinating nerve root pain which is aggravated by coughing, and features of sensory ataxia with ocular involvement.

== Signs and symptoms ==
Signs and symptoms may not appear for decades after the initial infection and include weakness, diminished reflexes, paresthesias (shooting and burning pains, pricking sensations, and formication), hypoesthesias (abnormally diminished sense of touch), tabetic gait (locomotor ataxia), progressive degeneration of the joints, loss of coordination, episodes of intense pain and disturbed sensation (including glossodynia), personality changes, urinary incontinence, dementia, deafness, visual impairment, positive Romberg's test, and impaired response to light (Argyll Robertson pupil). The skeletal musculature is hypotonic due to destruction of the sensory limb of the spindle reflex. The deep tendon reflexes are also diminished or absent; for example, the "knee jerk" or patellar reflex may be lacking (Westphal's sign). A complication of tabes dorsalis can be transient neuralgic paroxysmal pain affecting the eyes and the ophthalmic areas, previously called "Pel's crises" after Dutch physician P.K. Pel. Now more commonly called "tabetic ocular crises", an attack is characterized by sudden, intense eye pain, tearing of the eyes and sensitivity to light.

"Tabes dorsalgia" is a related lancinating back pain.

"Tabetic gait" is a characteristic ataxic gait of untreated syphilis where the person's feet slap the ground as they strike the floor due to loss of proprioception. In daylight the person can avoid some unsteadiness by watching their own feet.

== Cause ==
Tabes dorsalis is caused by demyelination by advanced syphilis infection (tertiary syphilis) when the primary infection by the causative spirochete bacterium, Treponema pallidum, is left untreated for an extended period of time (past the point of blood infection by the organism). The spirochete invades large myelinated fibers, leading to the involvement of the dorsal column medial leminiscus pathway rather than the spinothalamic tract.

== Diagnosis ==
Routine screening for syphilis. Treponemal antibody usually positive both in blood and in CSF also. In CSF lymphocytosis and elevated protein found. Serological tests are usually positive.

== Treatment ==
Intravenously administered penicillin is the treatment of choice. Associated pain can be treated with opiates, valproate, or carbamazepine. Those with tabes dorsalis may also require physical therapy and occupational therapy to deal with muscle wasting and weakness. Preventive treatment for those who come into sexual contact with an individual with syphilis is important.

== Prognosis ==
Left untreated, tabes dorsalis can lead to paralysis, dementia, and blindness. Existing nerve damage cannot be reversed.

== Epidemiology ==
The disease is more frequent in males than in females. Onset is commonly during mid-life. The incidence of tabes dorsalis is rising, in part due to co-associated HIV infection.

== History ==
Although there were earlier clinical accounts of this disease, and descriptions and illustrations of the posterior columns of the spinal cord, it was the Berlin neurologist Romberg whose account became the classical textbook description, first published in German and later translated into English.

Sir Arthur Conan Doyle, author of the Sherlock Holmes stories, completed his doctorate on tabes dorsalis in 1885.

== Society and culture ==
=== Notable patients ===
- German storywriter E.T.A. Hoffmann appears to have had and died in 1822 from tabes dorsalis.
- Mary Todd Lincoln [Dec 12, 1818 – Jul 16, 1882], wife of U.S. President Abraham Lincoln and America's First Lady from 1861 to 1865 most probably suffered from tabes dorsalis as early as 1869, at age 51. She died of a stroke at age 63 in Springfield, IL.
- The French novelist Alphonse Daudet kept a journal of the pain he experienced from this condition which was posthumously published as La Doulou (1930) and translated into English as In the Land of Pain (2002) by Julian Barnes.
- Poet Charles Baudelaire contracted syphilis in 1839 and resorted to opium to help alleviate the pain of tabes dorsalis ascending his spine.
- Painter Édouard Manet died of syphilis complications, including tabes dorsalis, in 1883, aged 51.
- Boxer Charley Mitchell
- Meyer Nudelman, the father of author and doctor Sherwin Nuland, who described his father's condition extensively in his book Lost in America; A Journey with my Father (2003).
- Season 8, episode 6, entitled Parents from the medical drama House, featured a father of a patient diagnosed with said disorder. This was used as the "eureka moment" of the episode, diagnosing the teenage patient with neurosyphilis.

== See also ==
- General paresis of the insane
