= Locomotor ataxia =

Medical condition

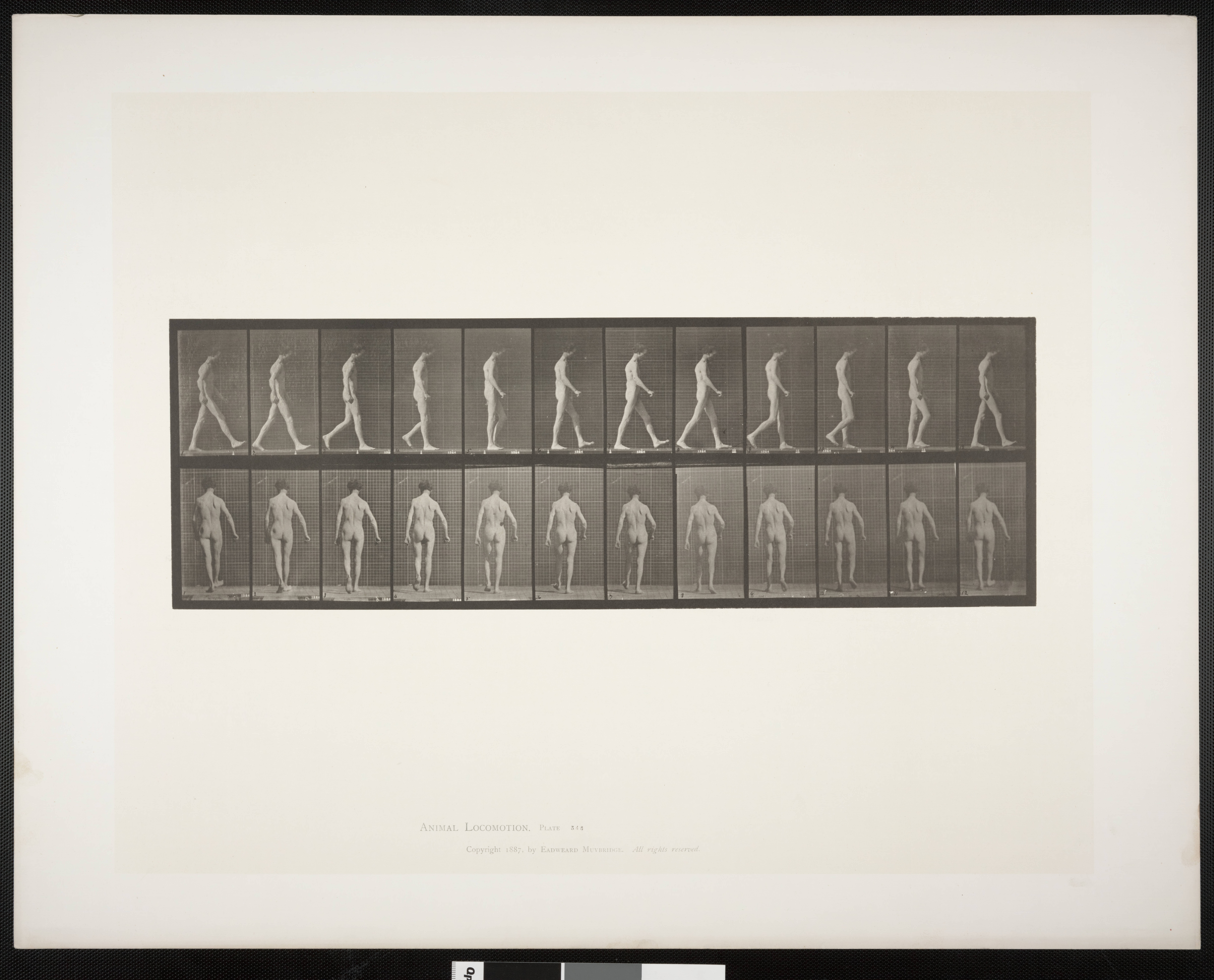
"Nude man with locomotor ataxia walking", Eadweard Muybridge

Locomotor ataxia is the inability to precisely control one's own bodily movements.

== Disease ==
People afflicted with this disease may walk in a jerky, non-fluid manner. They will not know where their arms and legs are without looking (i.e., a failure of proprioception), but can, for instance, feel and locate a hot object placed against their feet. It is often a symptom of tabes dorsalis, which is a key finding in tertiary syphilis.

It is caused by degeneration of the posterior (dorsal) white column of the spinal cord.

== In popular culture ==
The effects of neurosyphilis (such as locomotor ataxia) are dramatized in the story "Love O' Women" by Rudyard Kipling.

Bram Stoker's death certificate named the cause of death as "Locomotor Ataxia 6 months", presumed to be a reference to neurosyphilis.
