= Otto Lowenstein =

German-American neuropsychiatrist

Soon after arriving in New York in 1939

Otto Lowenstein (7 May 1889 – 25 March 1965) was a German-American neuropsychiatrist who was a native of Osnabrück.

He grew up in Preußisch Oldendorf, the son of Julius Lowenstein, a merchant, and Henriette Grunewald, into a Jewish family, and, when he was 19, began to study mathematics and philosophy at the University of Göttingen, before switching to medicine in another university.

In 1914 he received his medical degree from the University of Bonn, and following service as a military physician during World War I, he returned to Bonn as a neuropsychiatric assistant to Alexander Westphal. While at Bonn, he was involved in the fields of pediatric psychiatry and experimental psychology. He pursued funding from the Government of Westphalia, then developed and opened the first children's psychiatric hospital in the world. He became Chief of Staff at this new Neuropsychiatric Hospital of Bonn University (1920–1926). He became Chief Neuropsychiatrist and Director of the State Hospital for Nervous and Mental Diseases and founded the pioneering Neuropsychiatric Hospital for children, serving as its head from 1926 to 1933. This hospital continues to operate to this day and is believed to be the first specialized hospital of its kind in the world. He was the Director of the Institute for Heredity in Neurology and Psychiatry, (Institut Fuer Neurologisch–Psychiatrische Erbforschung) from 1926 to 1933. Together with his wife, Dr Marta (Grunewald) Lowenstein, he conducted hundreds of interviews to develop family histories of neurological illnesses. While in Germany he also began early research into pupillography as a means to detect and diagnose mental and neurological disorders including engineering the first machines and methodologies to assist in the study of the eye as a window to the brain.

In 1933, because of his Jewish ethnicity, he relocated to Switzerland in order to escape Nazi persecution (led by a former army colleague who was envious of his work), working as a neuropsychiatrist at the Clinique La Métairie in Nyon. He was a member of the faculty of the University of Geneva, Department of Ophthalmology, and Director of the Pupillographic Laboratory from 1935 to 1939. Under his leadership, the laboratory and the equipment pioneered there were invented and used in his researching the pupil. In 1939 he emigrated to New York City, where he was associated with New York University and later Columbia Presbyterian Hospital. In New York, he continued neuro-ophthalmological research with his research assistant Irene Loewenfeld. As he was preparing final edits to a major compendium of his life work specializing on the pupil, he was taken ill with pancreatic cancer. His work was entrusted to Dr Loewenfeld who had received her Ph.D. From the University of Bonn under Dr Lowenstein's mentorship. The work was ultimately published in the 1990s and contains his research in two volumes.

He is remembered for his studies involving motion, size and functionality of the eye's pupil from a neuropsychiatric standpoint. In Germany and America, he created laboratories containing specialized equipment for research of the eye's pupil. He was particularly interested in the status of an individual's pupil during specific emotional and psychological states, as well as the condition of the pupil during periods of fatigue and alertness.

In 1957, he built an "electronic pupillograph" that incorporated infrared technology. This device was used to accurately measure and analyze the pupils' diameter, and was a forerunner to more sophisticated pupillographic instruments that were developed in later years. Lowenstein's pioneer experiments and numerous publications on pupillary topics were a major factor in bringing pupillography into American neuro-ophthalmological medicine.

Recently, a psychiatric clinic for children called Das Professor Otto Löwenstein Haus was founded at the University of Bonn in Lowenstein's honor.

He was survived by his wife Marta who died later in the same year and by his two daughters, Anne Elizabeth Löwenstein Perls of Pacific Palisades, California, and Mary Dorothy Theresa Löwenstein Rowe (aka Marieli Rowe) of Madison, Wisconsin.
