= Alexander Carl Otto Westphal =

German neurologist and psychiatrist

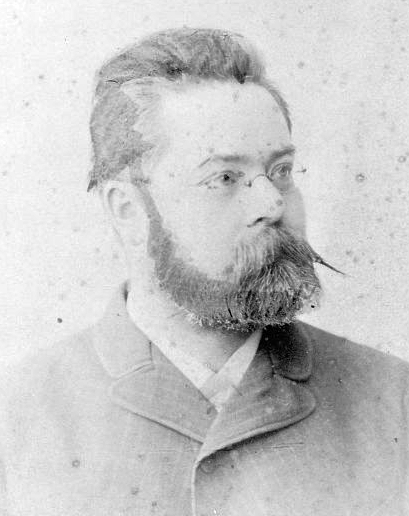
Alexander Westphal

Alexander Carl Otto Westphal (18 May 1863, Berlin – 9 January 1941, Bonn) was a German neurologist and psychiatrist. He was the son of the psychiatrist Karl Friedrich Otto Westphal (1833–1890) and Clara Mendelssohn and the grandson of Otto Carl Friedrich Westphal.

Alexander Westphal studied at Heidelberg and Berlin, receiving his doctorate at Berlin in 1888. He then became an assistant to Wilhelm Heinrich Erb (1840–1921) in Heidelberg and to Heinrich Curschmann (1846–1910) in Leipzig. In 1892 he became the head physician of the department for nervous diseases at the Berlin Charité under Friedrich Jolly (1844–1904), subsequently qualifying in the fields psychiatry and neurology (1894). In 1901 he accepted an invitation to the University of Greifswald as an associate professor, and three years later relocated to the University of Bonn as full professor. He stayed there until 1928.

Westphal made contributions towards the literature involving diabetes insipidus, leukaemia and pseudoleukaemia, as well as a variety of topics in psychiatry and neurology. He is eponymously associated with the "Westphal-Pilcz sign" (neurotonic pupillary reaction), a medical indicator named in conjunction with Polish neurologist Jan Pilcz (1870–1931).

He also produced a compilation of a complete edition of his father's scientific works. He trained a number of significant scientists, including Otto Lowenstein (1889–1965), with whom he was co-author of Experimentelle und klinische Studien zur Physiologie und Pathologie der Pupillenbewegungen, mit besonderer Berücksichtigung der Schizophrenie (part of the series, Abhandlungen aus der Neurologie, Psychiatrie, Psychologie und ihren Grenzgebieten.

== Sources ==
- Journal of Neuro-Ophthalmology - Fulltext: Volume 25(1) March 2005 p 44-49 Otto Lowenstein, Pioneer Pupillographer at www.jneuro-ophthalmology.com
