= Otto Carl Friedrich Westphal =

German ophthalmologist (1800–1879)

Otto Carl Friedrich Westphal (1800–1879) was a German medical doctor and Geheimer Sanitätsrath (privy medical counsellor). He wrote on the human eye and on optics. He was interested in environmental impacts on eyesight, including light quality, and argued that eyeglasses should be tailored to occupation.

Westphal also examined a variety of eyewashes and tinctures, and reportedly invented eye occlusion therapy, currently used for correction of strabismus and amblyopia.

Westphal was married to Caroline Friederike Heine (1811– 1888), the daughter of a wealthy banker. He was the father of Karl Friedrich Otto Westphal and grandfather of Alexander Carl Otto Westphal.
