= Westphal's sign =

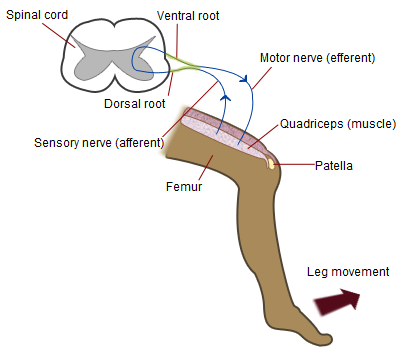
- Patellar tendon reflex arc
- Differential diagnosis: Peripheral nerve disease, Motor cortex lesion

Westphal's sign is the clinical correlate of the absence or decrease of patellar reflex or knee jerk. Patellar reflex or knee jerk is a kind of deep or stretch reflex where an application of a stimulus to the patellar tendon such as strike by a solid object or hammer caused the leg to extend due to such stimulus causes the quadriceps femoris muscle to contract.

It is named for Karl Friedrich Otto Westphal (1833–1890).

== Associated conditions ==
Westphal's sign has a clinical significance used in determining neurological disorders or diseases such as:

- receptor damage, peripheral nerve disease, involving the dorsal (sensory) columns of the spinal cord and cerebellar lesions
- lesions present within the motor cortex of the brain or the pyramidal tracts which it combined with muscular spasms
- complete interruption of sensory and/or motor impulse transmission in the femoral nerve
