= Patellar reflex =

Monosynaptic reflex

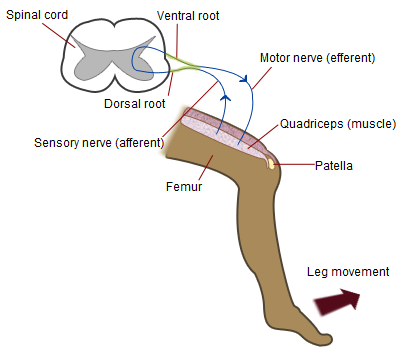
Schematic representation of patellar tendon reflex (knee jerk) pathway

The patellar reflex, also called the knee reflex or knee-jerk, is a stretch reflex which tests the L2, L3, and L4 segments of the spinal cord. Many animals, most significantly humans, have been seen to have the patellar reflex, including dogs, cats, horses, and other mammalian species.

== Mechanism ==
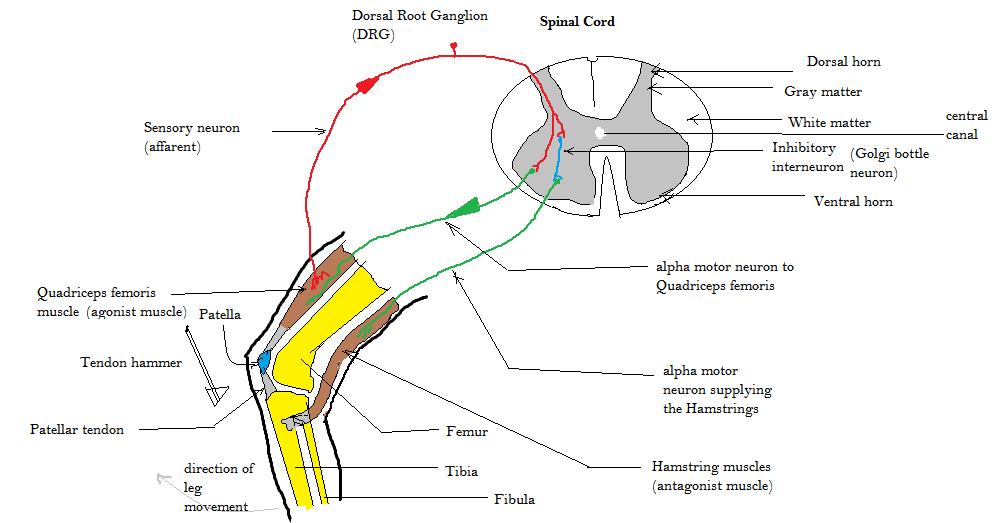
Representation of the patellar reflex pathway

Striking of the patellar tendon with a reflex hammer just below the patella stretches the muscle spindle in the quadriceps muscle. This produces a signal which travels back to the spinal cord and synapses (without interneurons) at the level of L3 or L4 in the spinal cord, completely independent of higher centres. From there, an alpha motor neuron conducts an efferent impulse back to the quadriceps femoris muscle, triggering contraction. This contraction, coordinated with the relaxation of the antagonistic flexor hamstring muscle causes the leg to kick. There is a latency of around 18 ms between the stretching of the patellar tendon and the beginning of contraction of the quadriceps femoris muscle. This is a reflex of proprioception which helps maintain posture and balance, allowing to keep one's balance with little effort or conscious thought.

The patellar reflex is a clinical and classic example of the monosynaptic reflex arc. There is no interneuron in the pathway leading to contraction of the quadriceps muscle. Instead, the sensory neuron synapses directly on a motor neuron in the spinal cord. However, there is an inhibitory interneuron used to relax the antagonistic hamstring muscle (reciprocal innervation).

This test of a basic automatic reflex may be influenced by the patient consciously inhibiting or exaggerating the response; the clinician may use the Jendrassik maneuver in order to ensure a more valid reflex test.

== Clinical significance ==
After the tap of a hammer, the leg is normally extended once and comes to rest. The absence or decrease of this reflex is problematic, and known as Westphal's sign. This reflex may be diminished or absent in lower motor neuron lesions and during sleep. On the other hand, multiple oscillation of the leg (pendular reflex) following the tap may be a sign of cerebellar diseases. Exaggerated (brisk) deep tendon reflexes such as this can be found in upper motor neuron lesions, hyperthyroidism, anxiety or nervousness. The test itself assesses the nervous tissue between and including the L2 and L4 segments of the spinal cord.

The patellar reflex is often tested in infants to test the nervous system.

== History ==
Wilhelm Heinrich Erb (1840–1921) and Karl Friedrich Otto Westphal (1833–1890) simultaneously reported the patellar tendon or knee reflex in 1875. The term knee-jerk was recorded by Sir Michael Foster in his Textbook of physiology in 1877: "Striking the tendon below the patella gives rise to a sudden extension of the leg, known as the knee-jerk."

== In popular culture ==
The term began to be used figuratively from the early 20th century onwards. O. O. McIntyre, in his New York Day-By-Day column in The Coshocton Tribune, October 1921, wrote: "Itinerant preacher stemming Broadway on a soap box. And gets only an occasional knee-jerk."

== See also ==
- Tonic vibration reflex – Sustained contraction of vibrated muscle
- Motor control – Regulation of movement within organisms possessing a nervous system
- Jendrassik maneuver – Medical maneuver to test reflexes

== Sources ==
- Gurfinkel' VS, Lipshits MI, Popov KE (1974). "Is the stretch reflex a basic mechanism in the system of regulation of human vertical posture?". Biofizika (in Russian). 19 (4): 744–8. PMID 4425696.
- Pinnock CA, Lin ES, Smith T (2003). "Physiology of the Nervous System". Fundamentals of Anaesthesia, 2nd Edition (2nd ed.). Greenwich Medical Media Ltd.
