= Karl Fürstner =

German neurologist and psychiatrist (1848–1906)

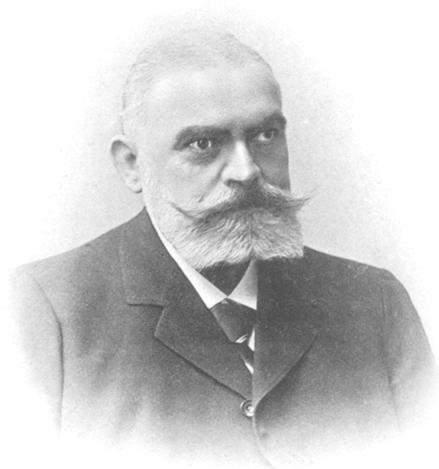
Karl Fürstner

Karl Fürstner (7 June 1848 - 25 April 1906) was a German neurologist and psychiatrist born in Strasburg, Uckermark.

He studied medicine in Würzburg and Berlin, where he received his doctorate in 1871. In 1872 he was an assistant at the pathological institute of the University of Greifswald, and afterwards worked under Karl Westphal (1833-1890) in the psychiatric department at the Berlin-Charité.

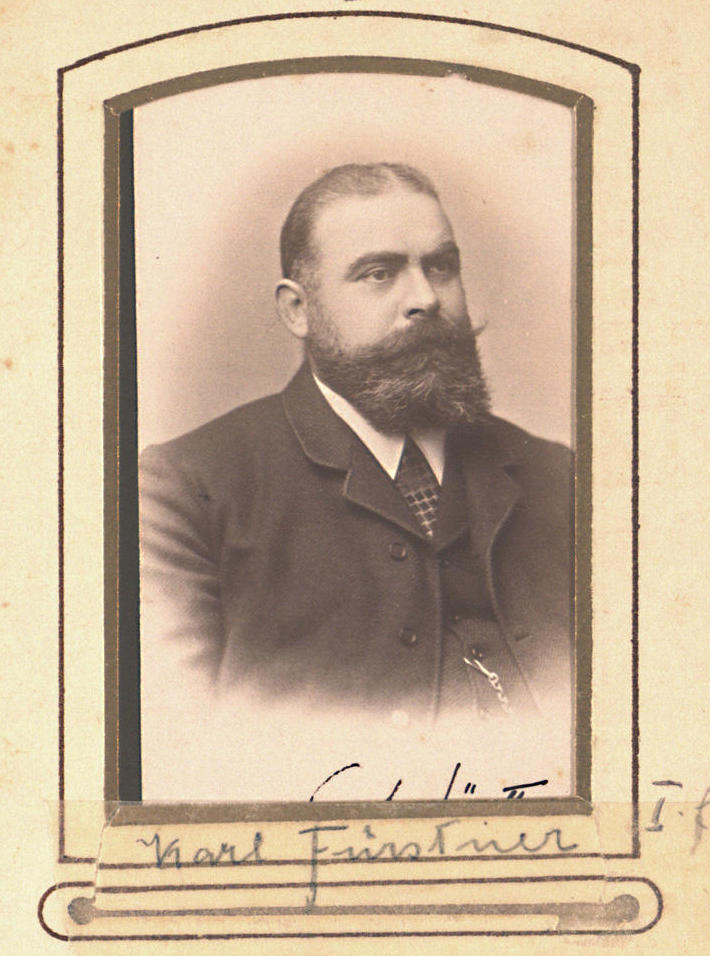

In 1878 he became the first physician to hold the chair of psychiatry at the University of Heidelberg. He kept this position until 1890, when he became professor of nervous and mental diseases at the University of Strasbourg. At Heidelberg his vacancy was filled by Emil Kraepelin (1856-1926). Among Fürstner's better known assistants was eugenicist Alfred Hoche (1865-1943).

Fürstner specialized in the fields of neuropathology and neuroanatomy. His work involved studies of progressive paralysis, the localization of brain tumors, and research of disorders that included postpartum psychosis, gliosis of the cerebral cortex and hemorrhagic pachymeningitis. Among his written works was his graduate thesis, Zur Streitfrage über das Othaematom, of which he discusses "othematoma" (hematoma of the outer ear). This condition was once believed by some doctors to be linked to brain disorders.
