= Pathognomy =

Study of expressed emotions

- Field: Non-verbal communication, Psychology
- Purpose: To infer emotions and mental states through transient facial and bodily expressions

Pathognomy is "a 'semiotik' of the transient features of someone's face or body, be it voluntary or involuntary". Examples of this can be laughter and winking to the involuntary such as sneezing or coughing. By studying the features or expressions, there is then an attempt to infer the mental state and emotion felt by the individual.

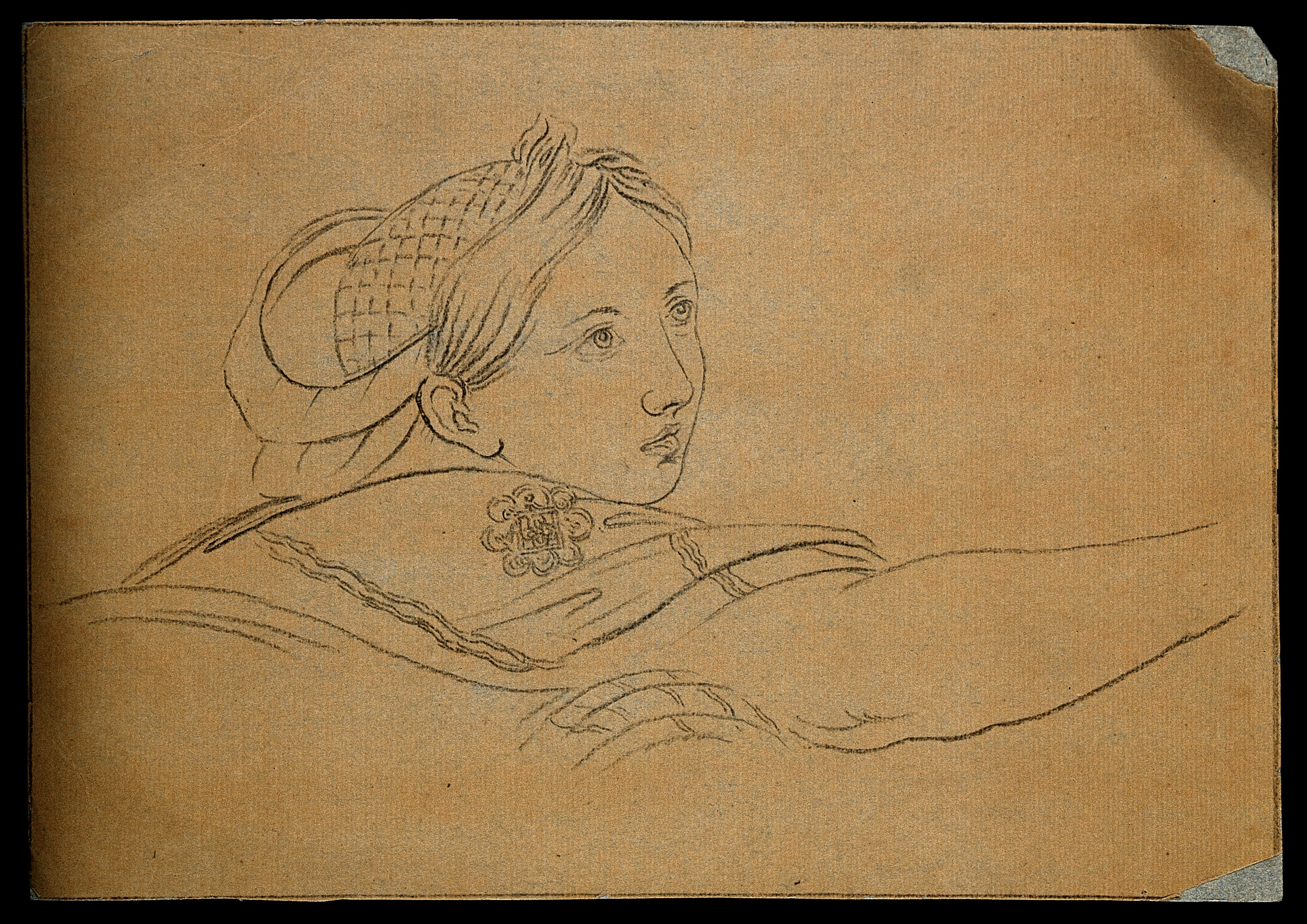
A woman expressing attention, desire and hope

Johann Kaspar Lavater separated pathognomy from physiognomy to limit the so-called power of persons to manipulate the reception of their image in public. Such division is marked by the disassociation of gestural expressions, and volition from the legibility of moral character. Both he and his critic Georg Christoph Lichtenberg branched this term from physiognomy, which strictly focused on the static and fixed features of peoples faces and the attempt to discover the relatively enduring traits from them.

Pathognomy is distinguished from physiognomy based on key differences in their features. The latter, which is concerned with the examination of an individual's soul through the analysis of his facial features, is used to predict the overall, long-term character of an individual while pathognomy is used to ascertain clues about one's current character. Physiognomy is based on the shapes of the features, and pathognomy on the motions of the features. Furthermore, physiognomy is concerned with man's disposition while pathognomy focuses on man's temporary being and attempts to reveal his current emotional state.

Georg Christoph Lichtenberg states that physiognomy is often used to cover pathognomy, including both fixed and mobile facial features, but the term is overall used to distinguish and identify the characteristics of a person. Pathognomy falls under the term of non-verbal communication, which includes various expressions, ranging from gestures to tone of voice, posture and bodily cues, all of which influence the knowledge and understanding of such emotions.

== Study of pathognomy ==
The science of pathognomy stands as a platform towards the practicality of identifying certain emotions, some of which may be more challenging to identify, such as subtle signs of disease to various psychological disorders. Psychological disorders include depression, attention deficit hyperactivity disorder, bipolar personality disorder, eating disorders, Williams syndrome, schizophrenia, and autism spectrum disorders. Emotional recognition through facial expression seems to be the core focus of perception towards understanding the signs of emotions. Over the years, there has been a significant improvement as to how much one can detect emotional signals through non-verbal cues across a variety of databases, from what was based on human emotion recognition, to now a database on computers that provide the same stimuli to research this recognition of emotion further.

== Methods used ==
=== Computer-based methods ===
In 1978, Ekman and his colleague Wallace V. Friesen created a taxonomy of facial muscles and their actions, providing an objective measurement, whereby the system describes the facial behaviour being presented. This is known as the Facial Action Coding System (FACS). Previous coding systems had a more subjective approach, only attempting to infer the underlying expressions, which heavily relied on an individual's perspective and judgement. The FACS mainly focuses on describing the facial expression being portrayed, but interpretation can later be added by the researcher where the facial behaviours closely relate to the emotional situation.

A freely available database that was based on the FACS is Radboud Faces Database (RaFD). This data set contains Caucasian face images of "8 facial expressions, with three gaze directions, photographed simultaneously from five different camera angles". All RaFD emotions are perceived as clearly expressed, with contempt being the only emotion being less clear than others. Langner et al. concluded that the RaFD is a valuable tool for different research fields towards facial stimuli, including recognition of emotions. In most forms of study that use this database, a method is carried out as follows; participants are presented with the images, and then requested to rate the facial expressions and also rate the attractiveness of each image. This can be further interpreted by the researcher to select the correct stimuli needed for their own research to be carried out.

=== Facial expression method ===
The conventional method for studying emotional perception and recognition, which can also be called the basic emotion method, typically consists of presenting facial expression stimuli in a laboratory setting, through the exposure of stimuli that presents males and females, to adults and children, participants are asked to determine the emotion being expressed. Silvan S Tomkins and his protégés, Carol E. Izard and Paul Ekman conducted such a method in the controlled lab environment. They created sets of photographs, posing the six core emotions; anger, fear, disgust, surprise, sadness and happiness. These photos provided the most precise and most robust representations for each emotion that was to be identified. Participants were then required to choose which word fit the face the most through these photographs. This type of method is commonly used to understand and infer the emotions portrayed through expressions made by individuals.

=== Auditory method ===
Recognition of emotion can be heavily identified through auditory modality; something which plays a vital role in communication within societies. In terms of the study or recognition of emotions through voice, this can be carried out in multiple ways. The main method of strategy for recognising emotion through voice is labelling and categorising which vocal expression matches which emotional stimuli (for example, happiness, sadness or fear). Older studies presented this method through paper-and-pencil tests with audio being played. The researcher then requested the participant to match the audio to the emotion shown on the paper. In Sauter et al.'s research, they had presented audio stimuli on speakers and asked participants to match the audio to the corresponding emotion by choosing, on a printed sheet, a label illustrated with a photo depicting the facial expression. Chronaki et al. used a fully-computerised method to present the stimuli on headphones and ask participants to select amongst keyboard keys with emotional word labels printed on them. These many modes of research on vocal expression follow a standard method, presenting the stimulus and requesting the participant to provide a matching emotion towards what they have heard. This form can further increase the knowledge of emotions and passions through such non-verbal communications.

== See also ==
Other related disciplines:

- Characterology
- List of emotions
- Phrenology
