= Nekton =

Actively-swimming type of aquatic life

Nekton or necton (from the Ancient Greek: νηκτόν, romanized: nekton, lit. 'to swim') is any aquatic organism that can actively and persistently propel itself through a water column (i.e. swim) without touching the bottom. They are generally aquatic animals with powerful tails and appendages (e.g. fins, pleopods, flippers or jets) that make them strong enough swimmers to counter ocean currents, and have mechanisms for sufficient lift or buoyancy to prevent sinking. Examples of extant nekton include most fish (especially pelagic fish like tuna and sharks), marine mammals (cetaceans, sirenia and pinnipeds) and reptiles (specifically sea turtles), penguins, coleoid cephalopods (squids and cuttlefish) and several species of decapod crustaceans (specifically prawns, shrimp and krill).

The term was proposed by German biologist Ernst Haeckel to differentiate between the active swimmers in a body of water, and the plankton that are passively carried along by the current. As a guideline, nektonic organisms have a high Reynolds number (greater than 1000) and planktonic organisms a low one (less than 10). Some organisms begin their life cycle as planktonic eggs and larvae, and transition to nektonic juveniles and adults later in life. This may make distinction difficult when attempting to classify certain plankton-to-nekton species as one or the other. For this reason, some biologists avoid using this term.

== History ==
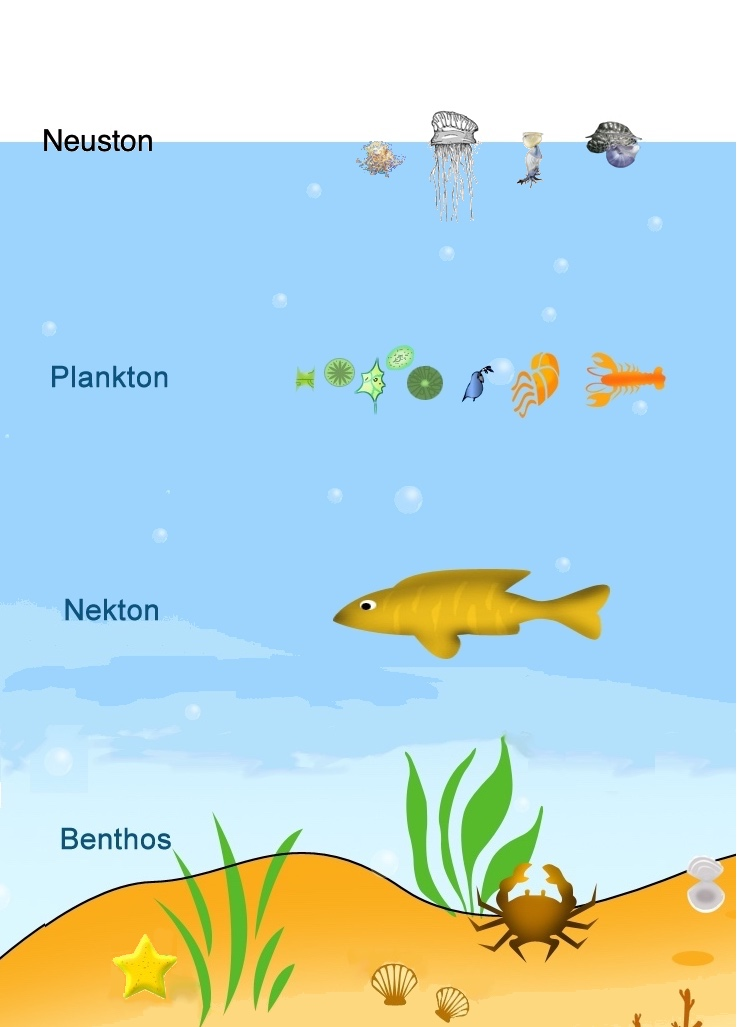
Nekton (organisms that swim against water currents) can be contrasted with plankton (organisms that drift with water currents), neuston (organisms that live at the ocean surface) and benthos (organisms that live at the ocean floor)

The term was first proposed and used by the German biologist Ernst Haeckel in 1891 in his article Plankton-Studien where he contrasted it with plankton, the aggregate of passively floating, drifting, or somewhat motile organisms present in a body of water, primarily tiny algae and bacteria, small eggs and larvae of marine organisms, and protozoa and other minute consumers. Today it is sometimes considered an obsolete term because it often does not allow for a meaningful quantifiable distinction between these two groups. The colonization of the water column is very important for the evolution of marine animals. The Devonian Nekton Revolution (DNR), well known as the Age of Fishes, accounted for more than eighty-five percent of nekton, which were widespread during the Carboniferous period that took place during the Paleozoic era. Some biologists no longer use the term.

== Definition ==
As a guideline, nekton are larger and tend to swim largely at biologically high Reynolds numbers (Re) from >1000 to beyond 10^{9}, where inertial flows are the rule, and eddies (vortices) are easily shed. On the other hand, plankton are small, and if swimming actively at all, do so at biologically low Reynolds numbers (0.001 to 10), where the viscous behavior of water dominates, and reversible flows are the rule. Organisms such as jellyfish and others are considered plankton when they are very small and swim at low Reynolds numbers, and considered nekton as they grow large enough to swim at high Reynolds numbers. Many animals considered classic examples of nekton (e.g., fishes and squids) start out life as tiny planktonic eggs and larvae and then, it is argued, gradually transition to nektons as they grow bigger and physically stronger.

In 1977, Soviet ichthyologist Yuriy Aleyev (1926–1991) further classified nektons into four natatorial ecomorphological categories:

- Eunekton — "true nekton"; actively swimming pelagic organisms that can locomote against turbulent flows and strong currents, and do not possess morphologies indicating an obligatory connection to terrestrial or benthic environments; typically Re >10^{5}; e.g. most fish, decapodiform cephalopods, cetaceans and sirenians;
- Planktonekton — “nekton tending towards plankton”; smaller, poorer-swimming pelagic animals that frequently allow themselves to be passively carried by currents but possess moderately-streamlined morphologies more typical of nektic instead of planktonic lifestyles, and do not indicate an obligatory connection to terrestrial or benthic environments; typically Re between 5.0×10^{3} and 10^{5}; e.g. lampreys, many forage fishes and most prawns;
- Benthonekton — active swimming organisms restricted to near-benthic environments; e.g. chimaeras, batomorphs and nautilids;
- Xeronekton — mainly aquatic and actively swimming air-breathing organisms that maintain an obligatory connection to terrestrial environments; e.g. pinnipeds, sea turtles and some aquatic insects.

Later publications on nektons such as Klugs et al. (2010) and Whalen & Briggs (2018) also accepted Aleyev's terminologies, although the latter Yale article more specifically defined nektons (referred to as "nektic taxa") as having laterally compressed and tapering morphologies, and thus renamed benthonekton as eudemersus and reclassified it into the demersal taxa instead of nektons due to their usually dorsoventrally depressed morphologies, while adding nektoxeron (primarily terrestrial but routinely swimming semiaquatic organisms that possess significant aquatic specializations, e.g.frogs, crocodilians, water birds, otters, most aquatic insects, etc.) in replacement.

== Oceanic nekton ==
Oceanic nekton comprises aquatic animals largely from three clades:

- Vertebrates (phylum Chordata), particularly pelagic fish, cetaceans and sea turtles, form the largest contribution; these animals have endoskeletons made of bones and cartilage and propel themselves via a powerful muscular tail and paddle/fan-shaped appendages such as fins, flippers or webbed feet.
- Cephalopods (phylum Mollusca), specifically decapodiform coleoids such as squids and cuttlefish, are pelagic nekton that swim using a combination of jet propulsion and fins. Octopodiform coleoids such as octopuses can also swim quite robustly over short distances, but they are mostly benthic ambush predators using arms to crawl around.
- Crustaceans (phylum Arthropoda), especially decapod eucarids such as prawns, shrimp and krill that can swim actively using specialized legs known as pleopods (a.k.a. swimmerets) and a tail fan formed by the telson and uropods. Benthic decapods such as lobsters and crayfish, though normally moving by walking, can also temporarily swim quickly backwards as an escape response. Some crab species can also swim in open waters using their last pair of legs (pereiopods) for paddling.

There are organisms whose initial life stage is identified as planktonic, but when they grow and increase in body size they become gradually more nektonic. Typical examples are the juveniles of fish (fries) and squids, as well as the medusa of jellyfish, which can actively propel itself though generally insufficient to overcome strong currents.

== See also ==
- Neuston — organisms (including microscopic) living at the surface of the water
- Plankton — organisms (including microscopic) living and drifting passively at the main column of a body of water
- Benthos — organisms (including microscopic) living at the bottom of a body of water
- Micronekton
