= Escape reflex =

Escape reflex, or escape behavior, is any kind of escape response found in an animal when it is presented with an unwanted stimulus. It is a simple reflectory reaction in response to stimuli indicative of danger, that initiates an escape motion of an animal. The escape response has been found to be processed in the telencephalon.

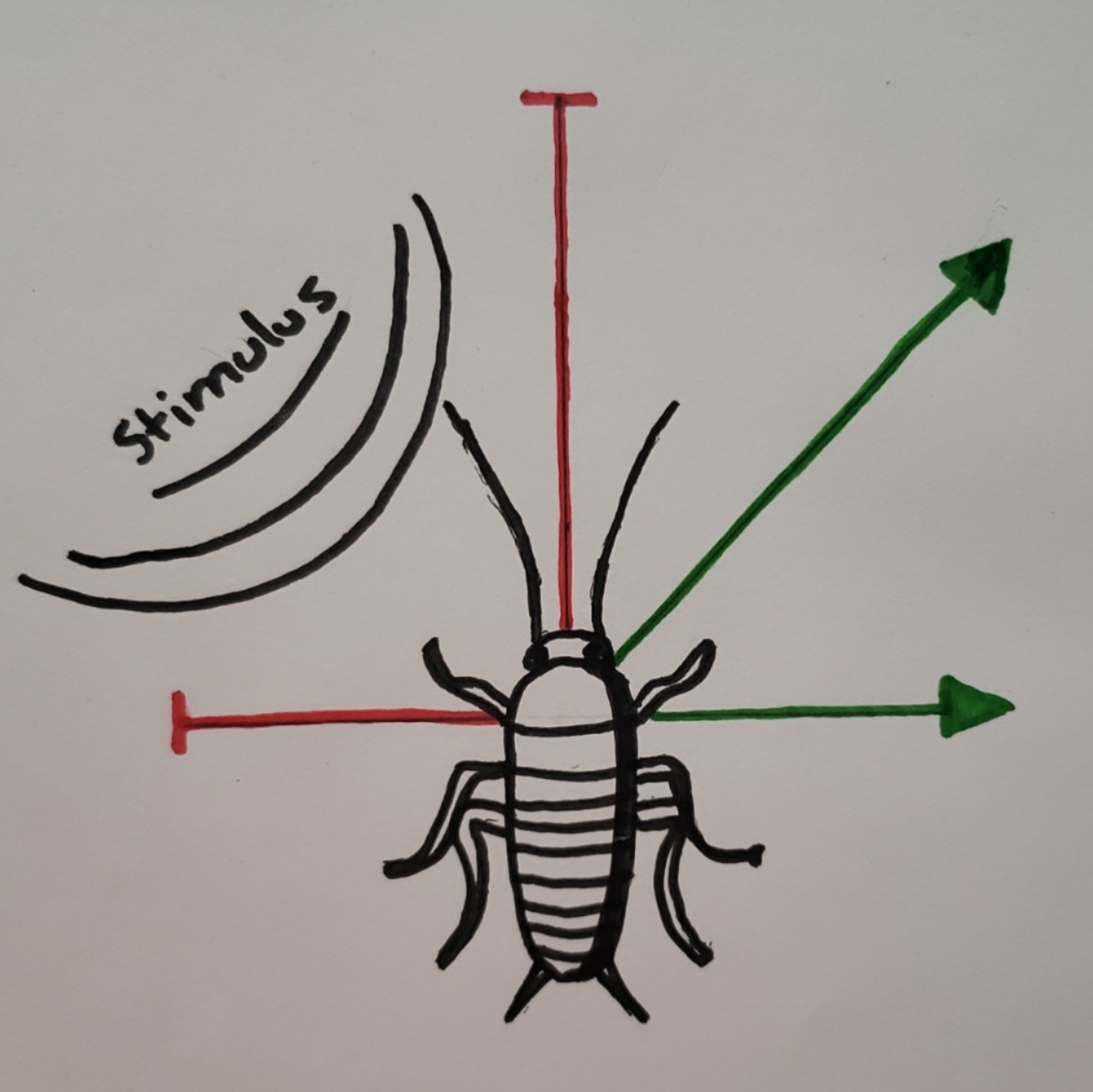
The above diagram is a simplified version showing that a cockroach will not venture towards a dangerous stimulus. Due to the escape reflex, the cockroach will take an alternative route once it has sensed the stimulus.

Escape reflexes control the seemingly chaotic motion of a cockroach running out from under a foot when one tries to squash it.

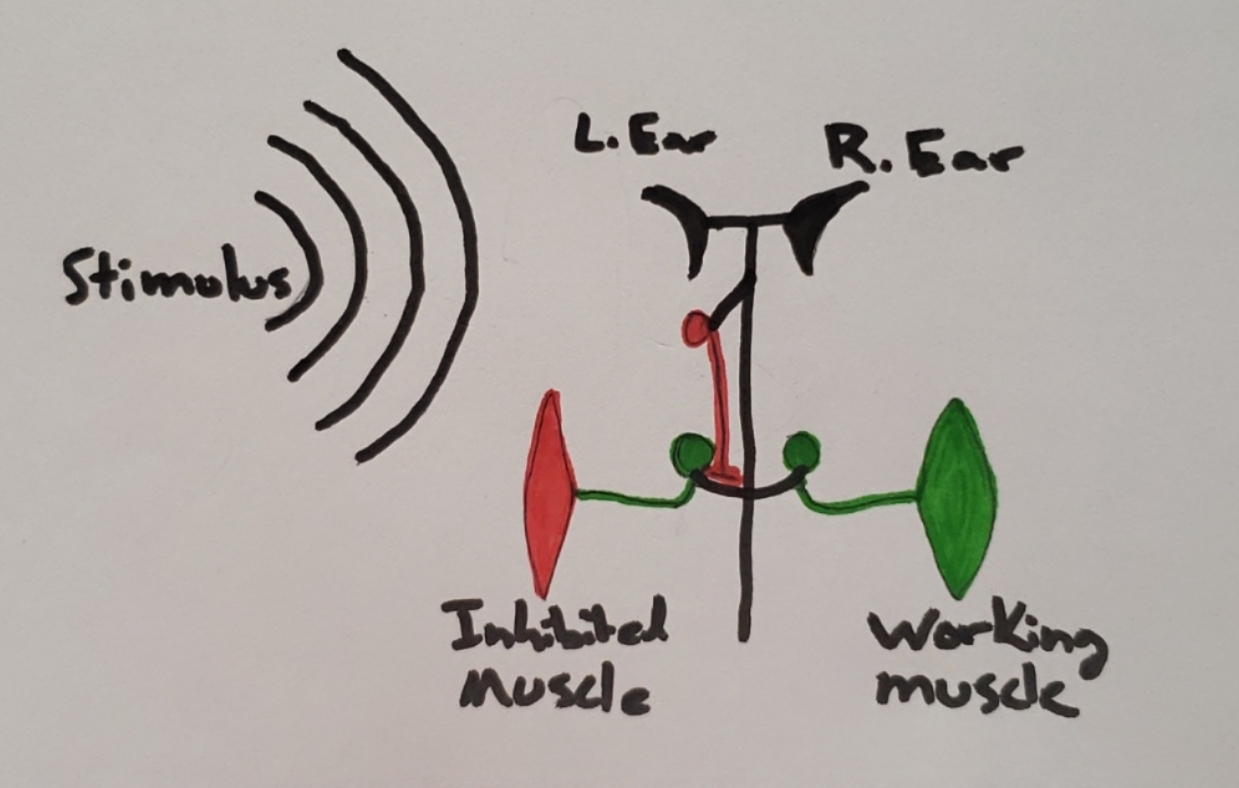
As the stimulus on the left side enters the ear, the signal is processed and inhibits the muscles on the same side as the stimulus. Muscles on the opposite side remaining working, which allows the creature to quickly pull away from the stimulus if it is threatening. This depiction is a simplified version and does not contain all accurate structures involved.

In higher animals, examples of escape reflex include the withdrawal reflex (e.g. the withdrawal of a hand) in response to a pain stimulus. Sensory receptors in the stimulated body part send signals to the spinal cord along a sensory neuron. Within the spine, a reflex arc switches the signals straight back to the muscles of the arm (effectors) via an intermediate neuron (interneuron) and then a motor neuron; the muscle contracts. There often is an opposite response of the opposite limb. Because this occurs automatically and independently in the spinal cord, the brain only becomes aware of the response after it has taken place.

== Crossed extensor reflex ==
The crossed extensor reflex is another escape reflex, but it's a type of withdrawal reflex. It is a contralateral reflex that allows for the affected limb to have the flexor muscles contract and the extensor muscles to relax while the unaffected limb has the flexor muscles relax and the extensor muscles to contract. For example, stepping on a piece of glass causes the affected leg to be lifted or withdrawn and the unaffected leg to carry the additional burden of weight and maintain postural support. In this example, the afferent nerve fibers are stimulated on the right foot. The nerve fibers travel up to the spinal cord where they cross the midline, go to the left side, and synapse on an interneuron. When the afferent nerve fibers synapse on the interneuron, they can either inhibit or excite an alpha motor neuron on the muscles on side contralateral to the stimulus.

== Escape reflex arcs ==
Escape reflex arcs have a high survival value enabling organisms to take rapid action to avoid potential danger or physical damage. The effectiveness of escape reflexes can be lowered when an organism is experiencing high levels of fatigue and or stress. These factors cause delays or weakness in the reflex, and they can even develop into learned helplessness, which has been found in animals and Drosophila flies. The reflex can also be habituated as seen in the tail-flip escape reflex of crayfish. More recent studies have also indicated that, once this crayfish escape response is habituated, it can also be recovered. A similar long-term habituation of the C-start escape response has also been studied in the larvae of zebrafish.

Various animals may have specialized escape reflex arcs.

== Examples ==
- Withdrawal reflexes
  - Ducking (flexing the neck to protect the head)
  - Jumping at loud sounds
  - Withdrawal of a body part when it touches something (e.g., excessively hot or cold)
- Other
  - Lateral giant escape and tail-flip reflex in crayfish
  - Escape reflex in squid
  - Dorsal ramp interneuron (DRI) action in Tritonia mollusks
  - C-start in fish and amphibia
  - Escape reflex in earthworms

== See also ==
- Escape response
- Caridoid escape reaction
