= Giant fiber =

Giant fiber refers to large nerve fibers. The term may refer to:

- Squid giant axon
- Ventral nerve cord in earthworms and arthropods
