= Medial giant interneuron =

Cell type in crayfish

The medial giant interneuron (MG) is an interneuron in the abdominal nerve cord of crayfish. It is part of the system that controls the caridoid escape reaction of crayfish, clawed lobsters, and other decapod crustaceans. Crayfish have a pair of medial giants running the length of the entire animal, and are the largest neurons in the animal.

When a crayfish is given a sudden visual or tactile stimulus to the front part of the animal, the MG activates fast flexor motor neurons that cause the abdomen to flex, resulting in the crayfish moving directly backward, away from the source of the stimulation. This connection was first demonstrated by C. A. G. Wiersma in the red swamp crayfish, Procambarus clarkii.

The medial giant interneurons are less well studied than the lateral giant neurons, which trigger a similar escape behavior.

== See also ==
- Squid giant axon
