= Lobstering =

Lobstering may refer to:

- Lobster fishing
- Caridoid escape reaction, swimming backwards by frightened shrimp
