= Aquatic locomotion =

Biologically propelled motion through a liquid medium

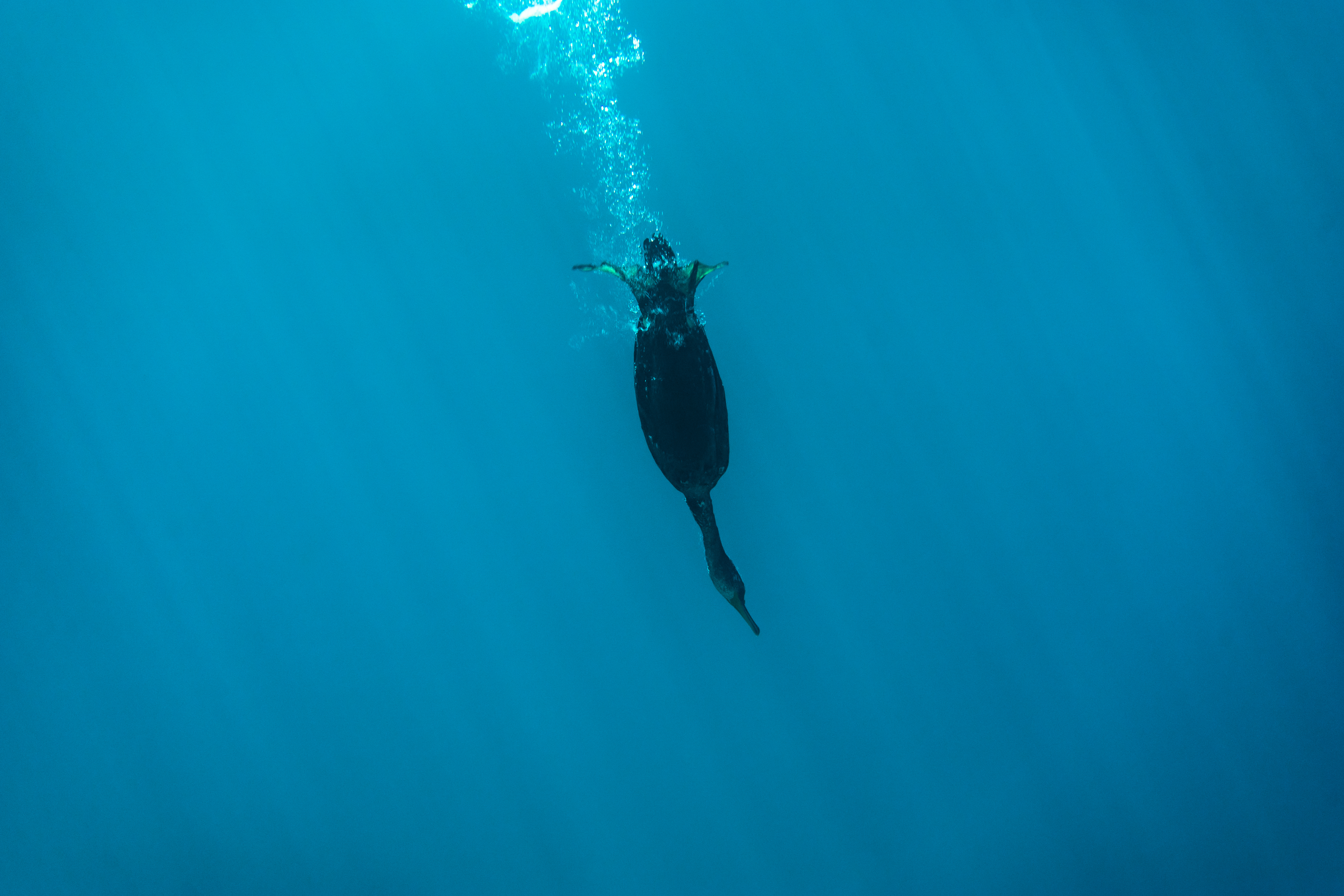
A great cormorant swimming

Aquatic locomotion or swimming is biologically propelled motion through a liquid medium. Swimming by different mechanisms has evolved repeatedly in organisms including arthropods, fish, molluscs, amphibians, reptiles, birds, and mammals. Many single-celled organisms including bacteria and ciliates use motile organelles, cilia or flagella, while others use pseudopodia, temporary projections of the cell body powered by the cytoskeletal protein actin. Larger organisms may swim by undulating their bodies, as in many fish and worms; by jet propulsion, as in cephalopods such as squid; or by moving flippers like wings, as in sea turtles.

== Evolution of swimming ==
Jellyfish in motion

Swimming has evolved repeatedly in unrelated lineages. Fossils claimed to be jellyfish occur in the Ediacaran, but the first free-swimming animals appear in the Early to Middle Cambrian. These are mostly related to the arthropods, and include the Dinocaridids, which swam by means of lateral lobes in a fashion reminiscent of today's cuttlefish and rays. Cephalopods joined the ranks of the active swimmers (nekton) in the late Cambrian, and chordates were probably swimming from the Early Cambrian. Many terrestrial animals retain some capacity to swim; some have returned to the water and developed the capacities for aquatic locomotion. Most apes (including humans) have lost the swimming instinct.

== Micro-organisms ==
Microbial swimmers, sometimes called microswimmers, are microscopic entities that have the ability to move in fluid or aquatic environment. They are found everywhere among microorganisms, such as bacteria, archaea, protists, sperm and microanimals.

=== Flagella and cilia ===
The flagellum of a Gram-negative bacterium is rotated by a molecular motor at its base.

Many small organisms such as bacteria have flagella which enable them to move in liquid environments. They use the protons of an electrochemical gradient to move their flagella. Torque in the flagella of bacteria is created by particles that conduct protons around the base of the flagellum. The direction of rotation of the flagella comes from the occupancy of the proton channels along the perimeter of the flagellar motor. Rod-shaped bacteria swim using rotating flagella. Sperm swim in much the same way.

Ciliates such as Paramecium use small flagella called cilia to move through the water. One ciliate may have hundreds to thousands of cilia, densely packed together in arrays. During movement, an individual cilium deforms using a high-friction power stroke followed by a low-friction recovery stroke. The deformation of each cilium is in phase with the deformation of its neighbor, propagating deformation waves along the surface of the organism. These waves of cilia, displaying collective behavior in a metachronal rhythm, allow the organism to move using the cilia in a coordinated manner. Paramecium can propel through water at up to 500 micrometers per second.

=== Twitching and gliding ===
Some bacteria can move by twitching and gliding, without using flagella. Twitching depends on the extension, attachment to a surface, and retraction of type IV pili which pull the cell forwards in a manner similar to the action of a grappling hook, providing energy to move the cell forward. Bacterial gliding uses different motor complexes, such as the focal adhesion complexes of Myxococcus.

=== Pseudopodia ===
Movement using a pseudopod is accomplished through increases in pressure at one point on the cell membrane. This pressure increase is the result of actin polymerization between the cortex and the membrane. As the pressure increases the cell membrane is pushed outward creating the pseudopod. When the pseudopod moves outward, the rest of the body is pulled forward by cortical tension. The result is cell movement through the fluid medium. Furthermore, the direction of movement is determined by chemotaxis. When chemoattraction occurs in a particular area of the cell membrane, actin polymerization can begin and move the cell in that direction. An excellent example of an organism that utilizes pseudopods is Naegleria fowleri.

== Larger organisms ==
=== Jet propulsion ===
Jet propulsion is a method of aquatic locomotion where animals fill a muscular cavity and squirt out water to propel them in the opposite direction of the squirting water. Most organisms are equipped with one of two designs for jet propulsion; they can draw water from the rear and expel it from the rear, such as jellyfish, or draw water from front and expel it from the rear, such as salps. Filling up the cavity causes an increase in both the mass and drag of the animal. Consequently, the animal's velocity fluctuates as it moves through the water, accelerating while expelling water and decelerating while vacuuming water. Even though these fluctuations in drag and mass can be ignored if the frequency of the jet-propulsion cycles is high enough, jet propulsion is a relatively inefficient method of aquatic locomotion.

All cephalopods can move by jet propulsion, a very energy-consuming way to travel compared to the tail propulsion used by fish. The relative efficiency of jet propulsion decreases further as animal size increases. Since the Paleozoic, as competition with fish produced an environment where efficient motion was crucial to survival, jet propulsion has taken a back role, with fins and tentacles used to maintain a steady velocity. The stop-start motion provided by the jets, however, continues to be useful for providing bursts of high speed – not least when capturing prey or avoiding predators. Indeed, it makes cephalopods the fastest marine invertebrates. Most cephalopods float (i.e. are neutrally buoyant), so do not need to swim to remain afloat.

Jellyfish use a one-way water cavity design which generates a phase of continuous cycles of jet-propulsion followed by a rest phase. They move through the water by radially expanding and contracting their bell-shaped bodies to push water behind them. They pause between the contraction and expansion phases to create two vortex rings. Muscles are used for the contraction of the body, which creates the first vortex and pushes the animal forward, but the mesoglea is so elastic that the expansion is powered exclusively by relaxing the bell, which releases the energy stored from the contraction. Meanwhile, the second vortex ring starts to spin faster, sucking water into the bell and pushing against the centre of the body, giving a secondary and "free" boost forward. The mechanism, called passive energy recapture, only works in relatively small jellyfish moving at low speeds, allowing the animal to travel 30 percent farther on each swimming cycle. Jellyfish achieved a 48 percent lower cost of transport (food and oxygen intake versus energy spent in movement) than other animals in similar studies. One reason for this is that most of the gelatinous tissue of the bell is inactive, using no energy during swimming.

Scallops swim by slowly opening the gape of their two half-shells (called valves) and rapidly clapping them together. Closing the valves propels water with a strong force near the hinge via the velum, a curtain-like fold of the mantle that directs water expulsion around the hinge. They can swim both forwards and backwards.

Salps are colonial marine animals. Each colony member is a barrel-shaped zooid that can pump water from an inlet at one end to an outlet at the other end. A salp colony consists of a chain of zooids, and thus propels itself with multiple small jets of water, operating asynchronously (not in time with each other). This produces a relatively steady swimming speed, which is more efficient than a single pulsed jet.

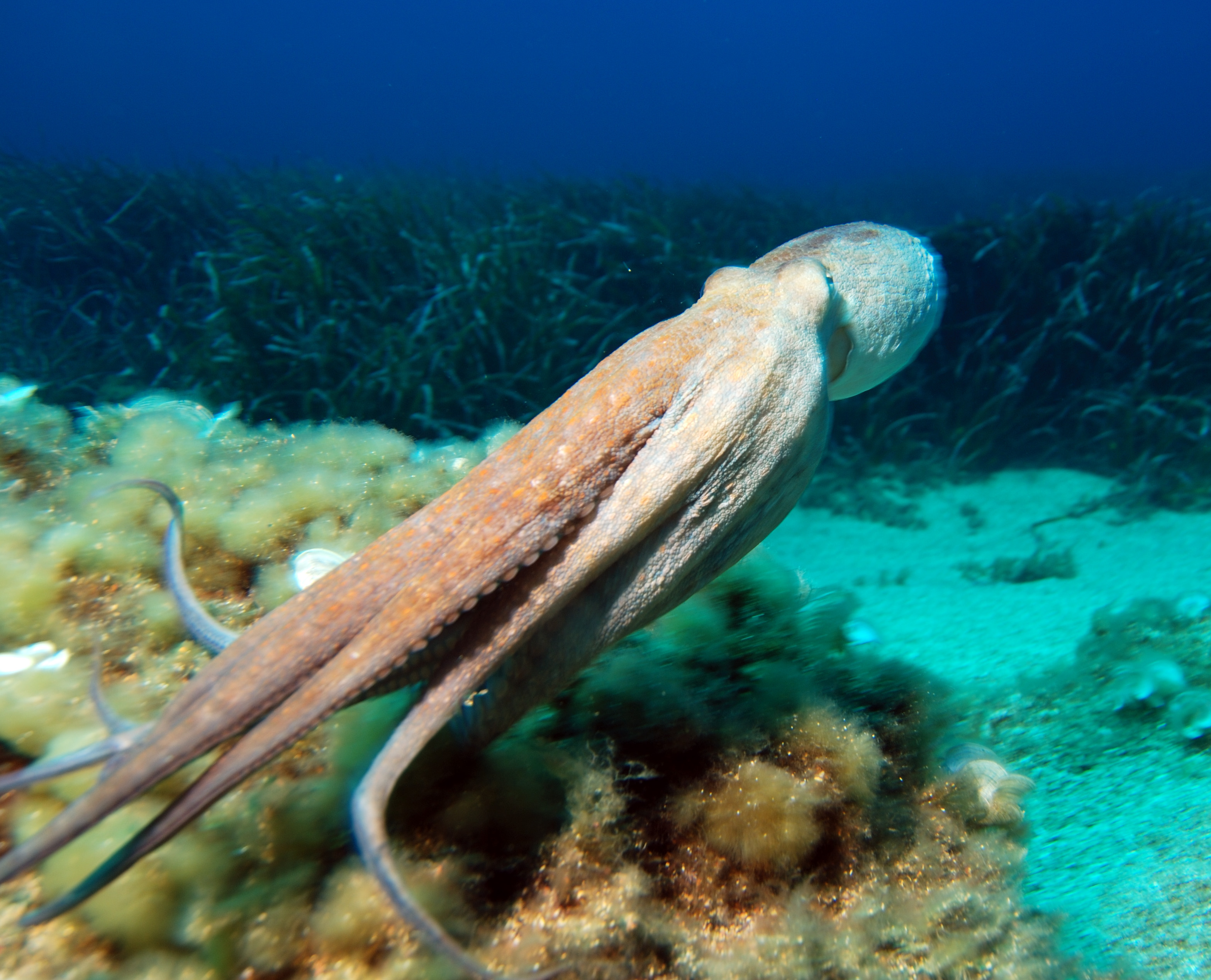
Octopuses swim headfirst, with arms trailing behind.

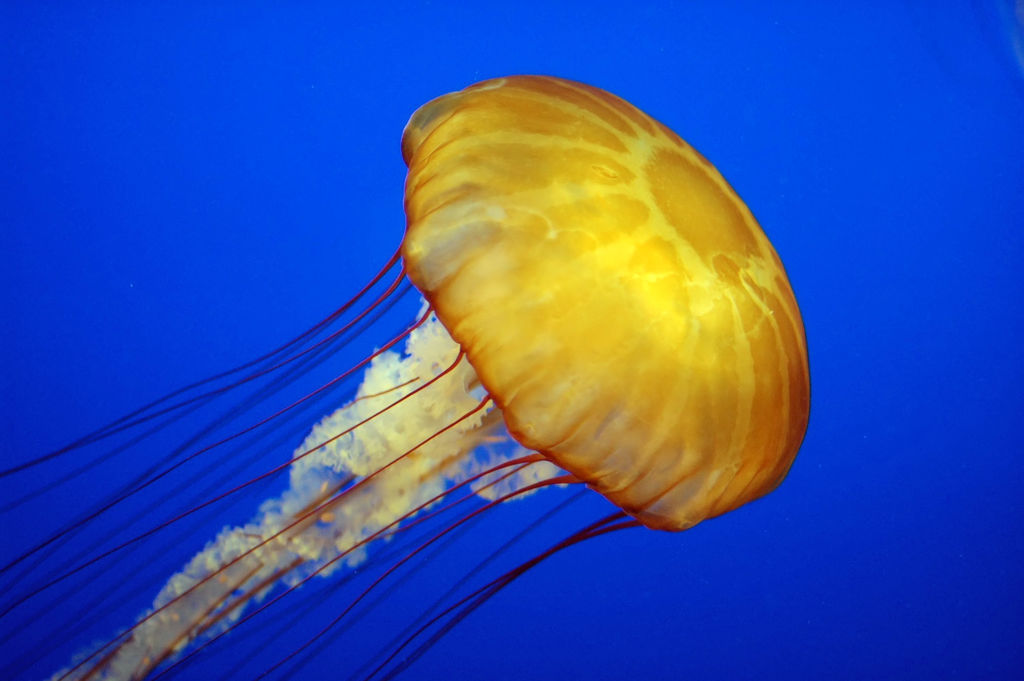
Jellyfish contract muscles in the jellylike bell to propel themselves. The elastic recoil creates a second (stop) vortex, adding efficiency.

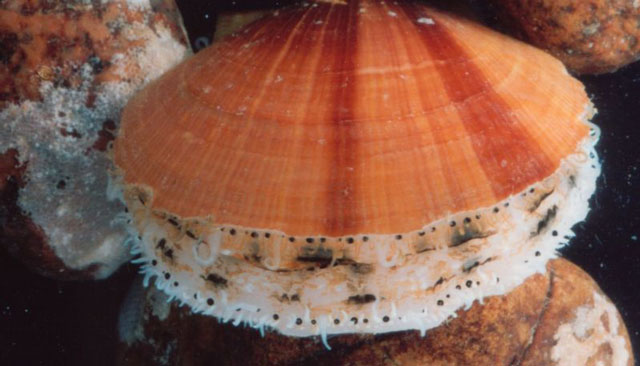
Scallops swim by opening the gape of their two shells and clapping them closed.

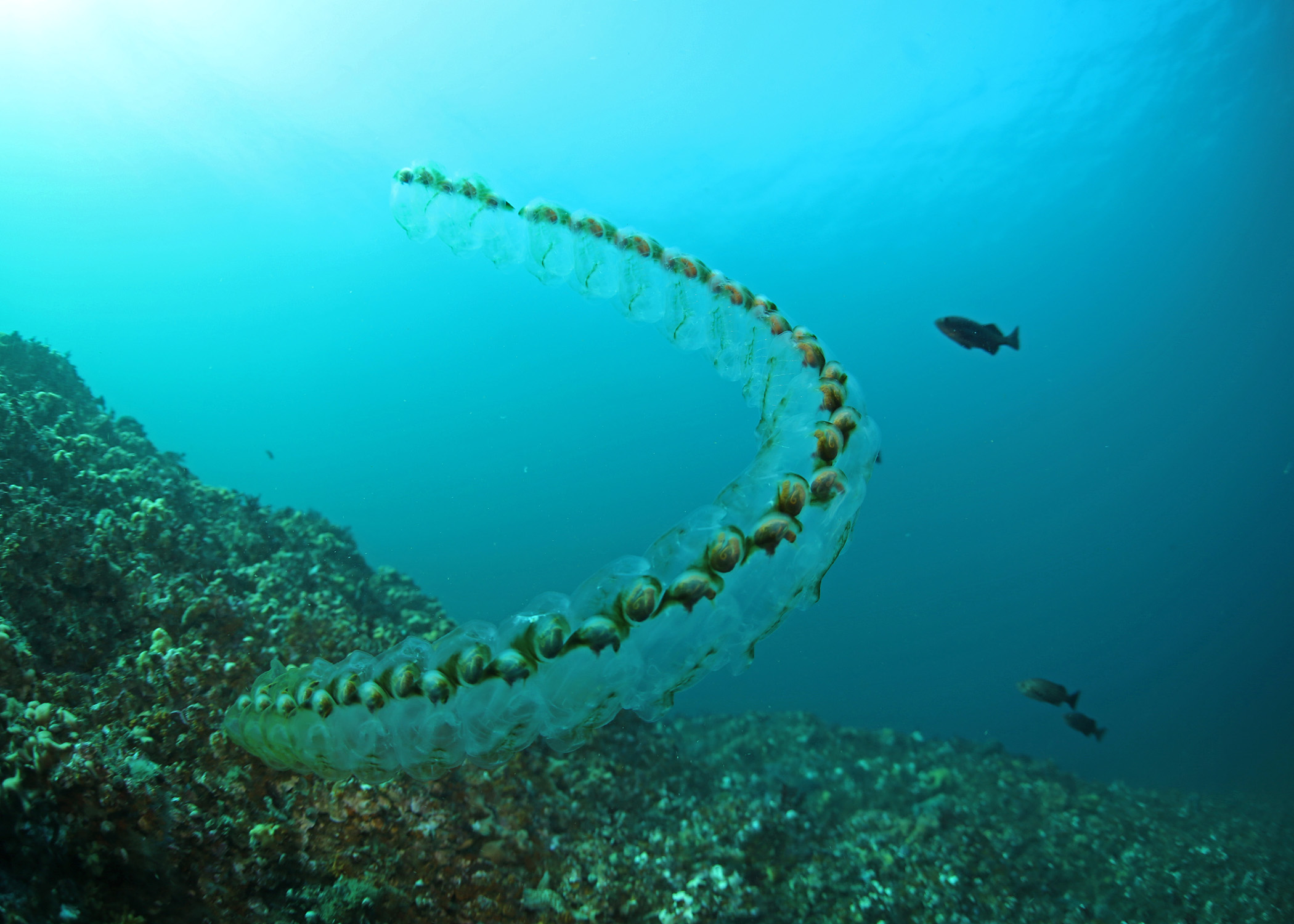
A salp is a colony of small zooids in a chain. Each zooid pushes a small jet of water through its body, together creating a steady propulsive force.

=== Undulating the body ===
Many fish swim through water by creating undulations with their bodies or oscillating their fins. The undulations create components of forward thrust complemented by a rearward force, side forces which are wasted portions of energy, and a normal force that is between the forward thrust and side force. Different fish swim by undulating different parts of their bodies. Eel-shaped fish undulate their entire body in rhythmic sequences. Streamlined fish, such as salmon, undulate their tails. Some fish, such as sharks, use stiff, strong fins to create dynamic lift and propel themselves. It is common for fish to use more than one form of propulsion, although one mode of swimming is dominant in each species. Gait changes have been observed in juvenile reef fish of various sizes. Depending on their needs, fish can rapidly alternate between synchronized fin beats and alternating fin beats.

Crocodiles and amphibians such as newts, as well as amphibian tadpole larvae, use their deep, laterally compressed tails in an essentially carangiform (stiff body, movement mainly in tail) mode of propulsion. Terrestrial snakes, in spite of their 'bad' hydromechanical shape with roughly circular cross-section and gradual posterior taper, swim fairly readily when required, by anguilliform (eel-like) propulsion.

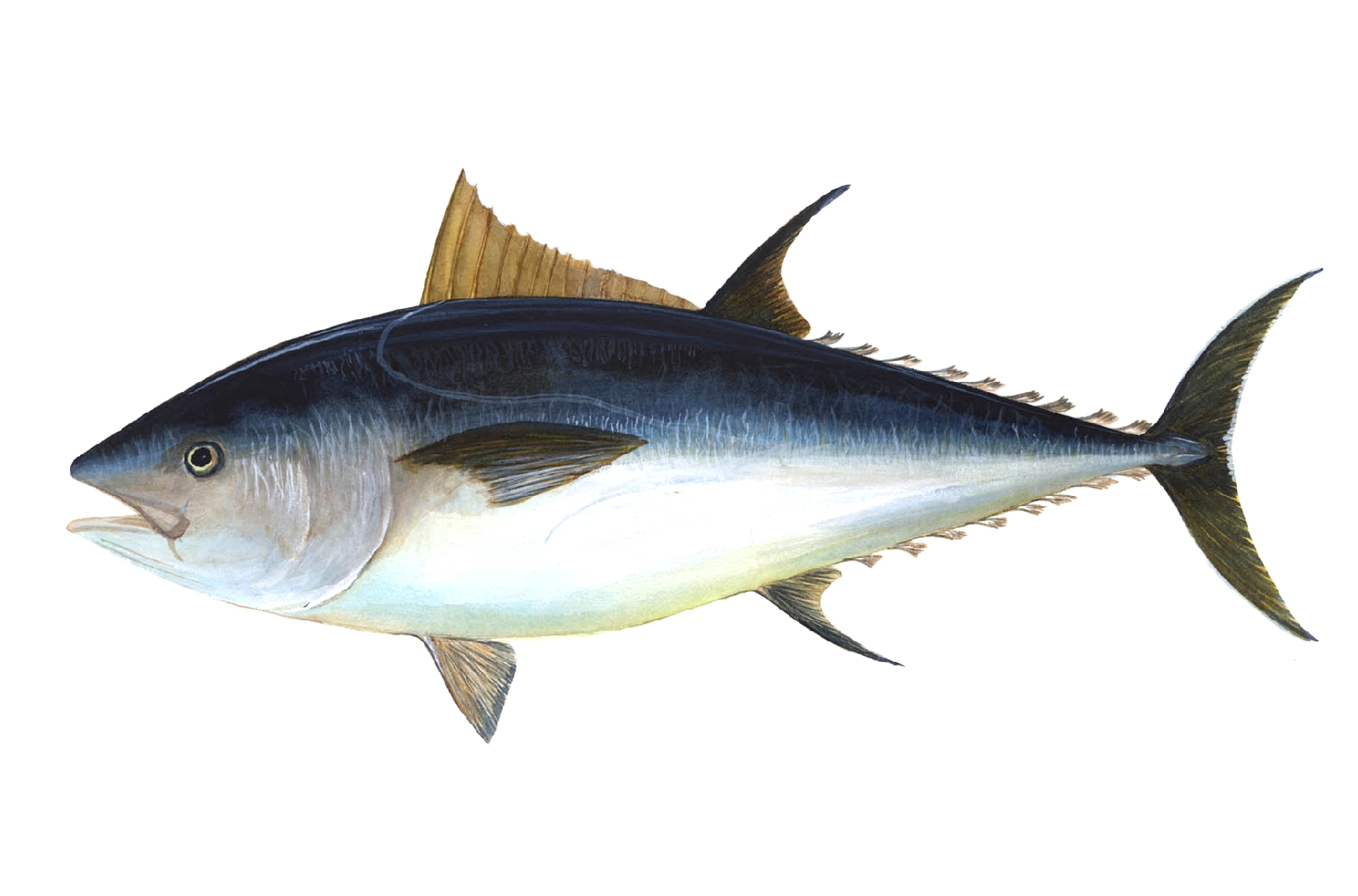
Open water fish, like this Atlantic bluefin tuna, are streamlined for straightline speed, with a deeply forked tail and a smooth tapered body.

Tadpoles' fish-like swimming motion

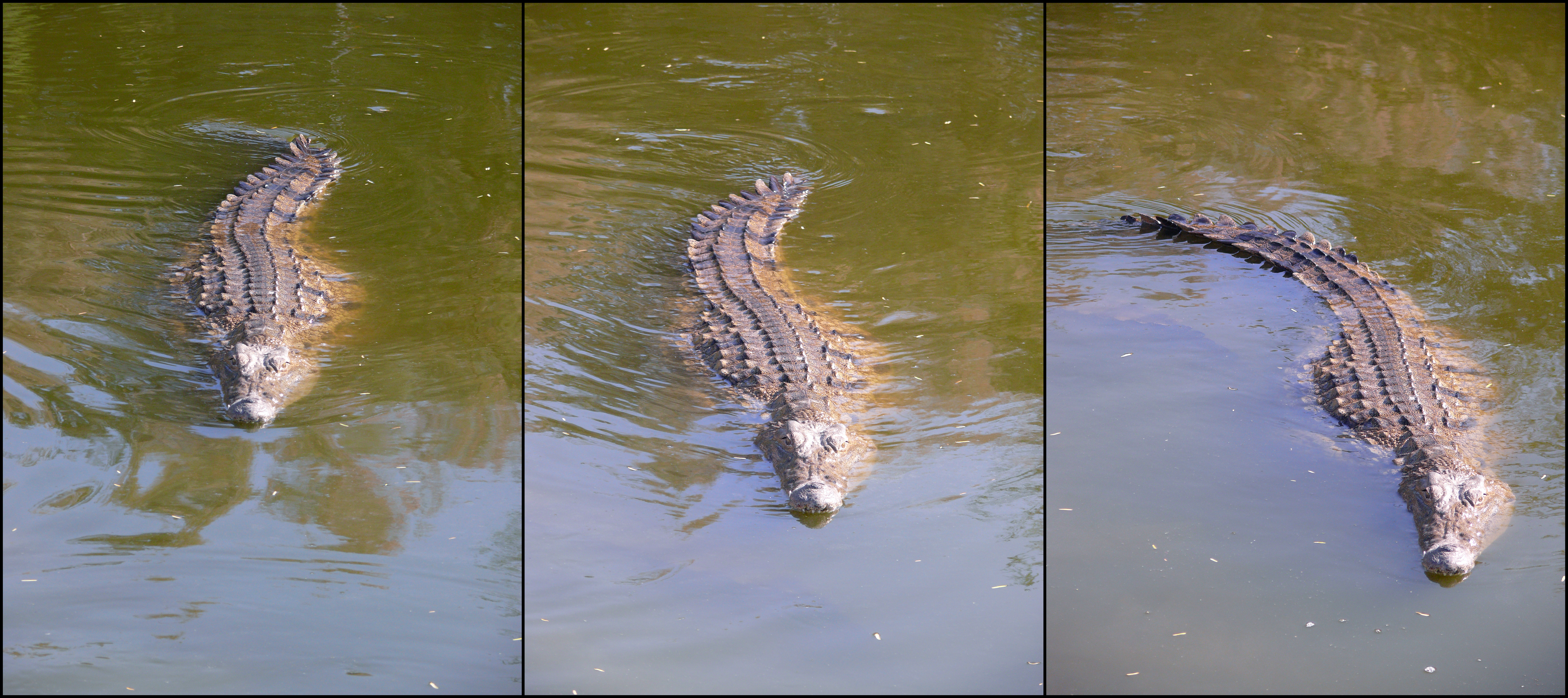
Nile crocodile (Crocodylus niloticus) swimming

=== Oscillating fins or flippers ===
Cheloniidae (sea turtles) have forelimbs adapted into flippers of high-aspect-ratio wing shape, with which they propel themselves in a bird's propulsive mode, as if flying through the water. Plesiosaurs of the Jurassic and Cretaceous periods propelled themselves mainly with their flippers. Some slow-swimming fish propel themselves by oscillating their fins.

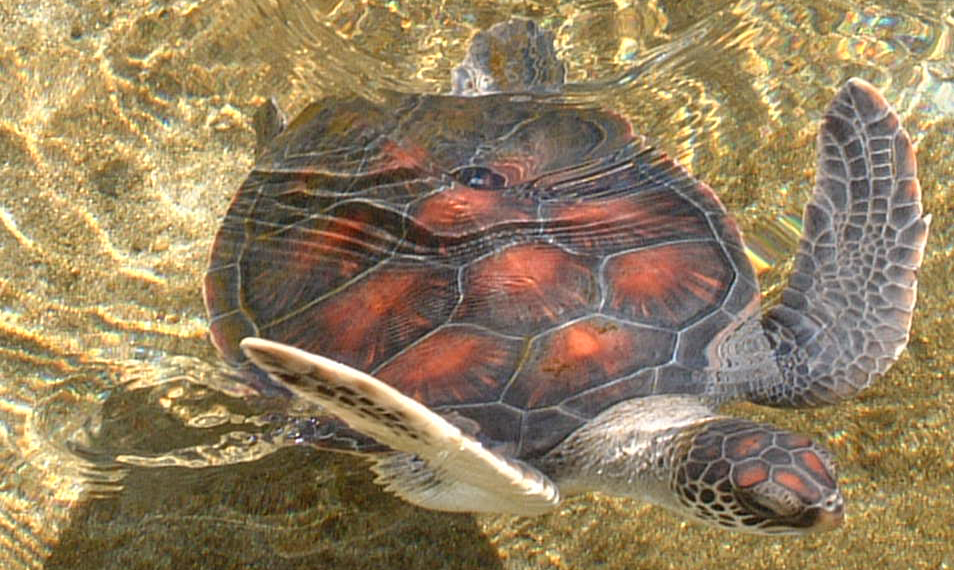
Immature Hawaiian green sea turtle in shallow waters

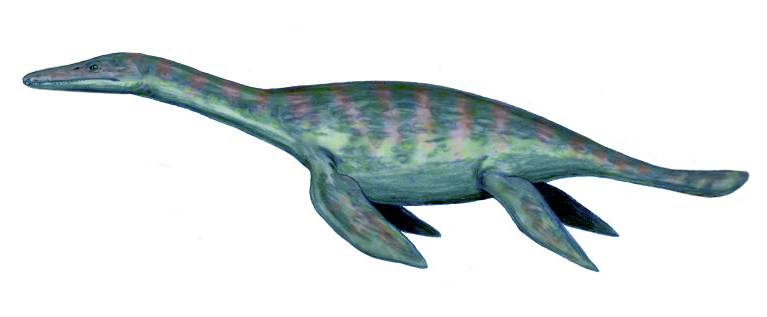
Plesiosaurs propelled themselves mainly with their flippers. Macroplata illustrated.

=== Pushing with webbed feet ===
Common toad (Bufo bufo) swimming

Frogs and toads lose the larval tail completely. They have evolved webbed feet and a mode of tailless aquatic propulsion that resembles a wide-spreading squat-jump, with their muscular hindlimbs flexing and then kicking rearwards together to push water and provide most of the propulsion, while the forelimbs are recruited for additional paddling when more agile maneuvers are needed. It is a rather efficient form of aquatic locomotion in shallow, slow-flowing waters because the legs are better streamlined for short accelerations, and the movements are "amphibious", i.e. the same jumping motion can also be used on land without needing to evolve a separate locomotive mechanism.

== Escape reactions ==
Some arthropods, such as lobsters and shrimps, can propel themselves backwards quickly by flicking their tail, known as lobstering or the caridoid escape reaction.

Some bony fish use fast-starts to escape from predators. Fast-starts are characterized by the muscle contraction on one side of the fish, twisting the fish into a C-shape. Afterwards, muscle contraction occurs on the opposite side to allow the fish to enter into a steady swimming state with waves of undulation traveling alongside the body. The power of the bending motion comes from fast-twitch muscle fibers in the central region of the fish. The signal to perform this contraction comes from a set of Mauthner cells which simultaneously send a signal to the muscles on one side of the fish. Mauthner cells are activated when something startles the fish.

Fast-starts are split up into three stages. Stage one, the preparatory stroke, is characterized by the initial bending to a C-shape with small delay caused by hydrodynamic resistance. Stage two, the propulsive stroke, involves the body bending rapidly to the other side, which may occur multiple times. Stage three, the rest phase, cause the fish to return to normal steady-state swimming and the body undulations begin to cease. Large muscles closer to the central portion of the fish are stronger and generate more force than the muscles in the tail. This asymmetry in muscle composition causes body undulations that occur in Stage 3. Once the fast-start is completed, the position of the fish has been shown to have a certain level of unpredictability, which helps fish survive against predators.

The rate at which the body can bend is limited by the inertia of each body part. This inertia assists the fish in creating propulsion from the momentum created against the water. The forward propulsion created from C-starts, and steady-state swimming in general, is a result of the body of the fish pushing against the water. Waves of undulation create rearward momentum against the water, providing the forward thrust required to push the fish forward.

== Efficiency ==
The Froude propulsion efficiency is defined as the ratio of power output to the power input:

nf = 2U_{1} / (U_{1} + U_{2})

where U1=free stream velocity and U2=jet velocity. A good efficiency for carangiform propulsion is between 50 and 80%.

=== Minimizing drag ===
Pressure differences occur outside the boundary layer of swimming organisms due to disrupted flow around the body. The difference on the up- and down-stream surfaces of the body is pressure drag, which creates a downstream force on the object. Frictional drag, on the other hand, is a result of fluid viscosity in the boundary layer. Higher turbulence causes greater frictional drag. Reynolds number (Re) is the measure of the relationships between inertial and viscous forces in flow ((animal's length x animal's velocity)/kinematic viscosity of the fluid). Turbulent flow can be found at higher Re values, where the boundary layer separates and creates a wake, and laminar flow can be found at lower Re values, when the boundary layer separation is delayed, reducing wake and kinetic energy loss to opposing water momentum. The body shape of a swimming organism affects the resulting drag. Long, slender bodies reduce pressure drag by streamlining, while short, round bodies reduce frictional drag; therefore, the optimal shape of an organism depends on its niche. Swimming organisms with a fusiform shape are likely to experience the greatest reduction in both pressure and frictional drag.

==== Drag-powered swimming ====
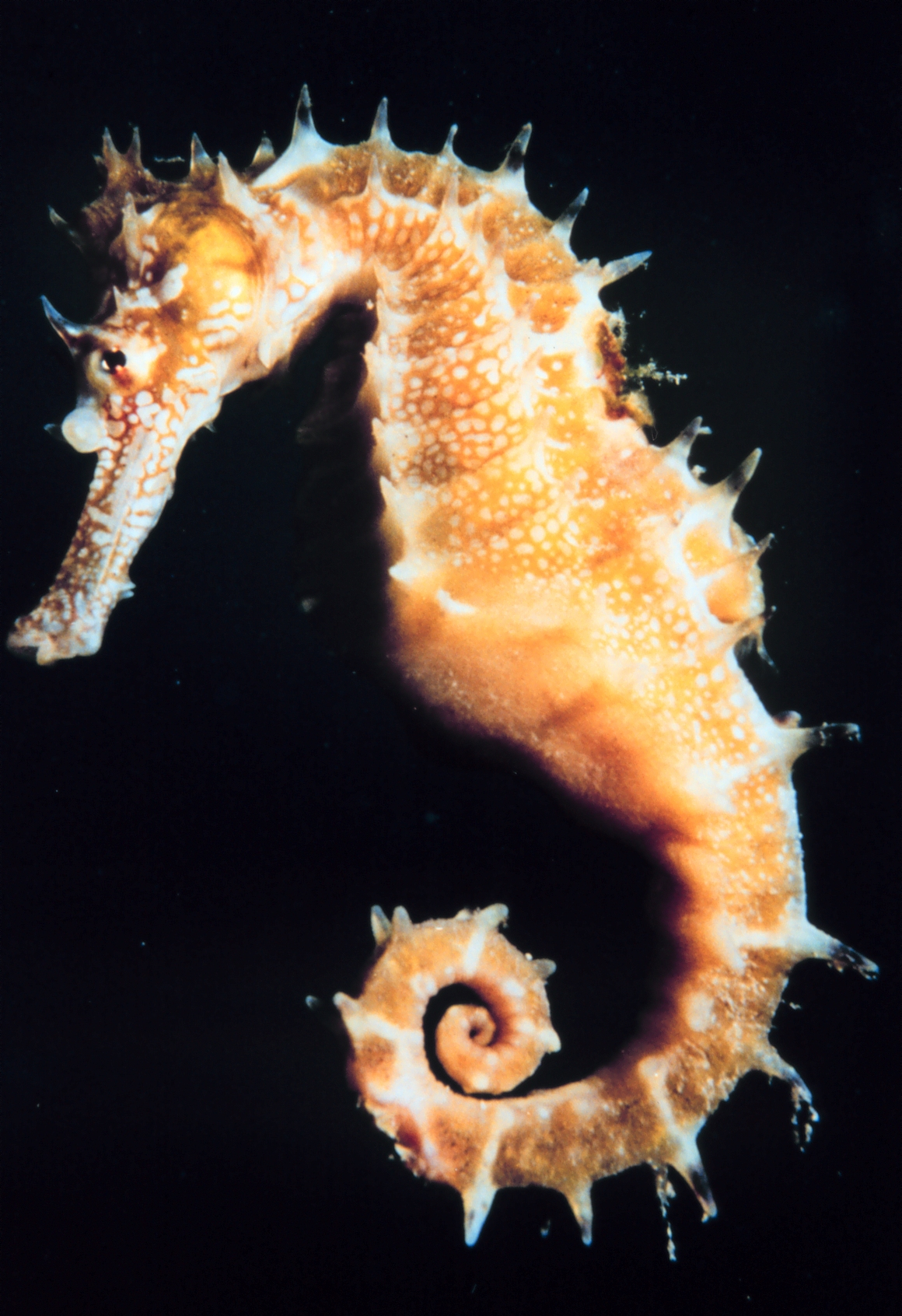
The slowest-moving fishes are the sea horses, often found in reefs

Friction is created when molecules of the fluid collide with the swimming organism. This causes drag, which is why many fish are streamlined in shape. Streamlined shapes reduce drag by orienting elongated objects parallel to the force of drag, allowing the current to pass over and taper off the end of the fish, making swimming more efficient. Some flat-shaped fish can take advantage of pressure drag by having a flat bottom surface and a curved top surface. This provides upward lift during swimming.

Lift-powered swimming can be compared to flying as appendages flap like wings. Drag powered swimming can be compared to oars rowing a boat, with movement in a horizontal plane, or paddling, with movement in the parasagittal plane. Drag swimmers use a cyclic motion, pushing water back in a power stroke, and return their limbs forward in the return or recovery stroke. Pushing water directly backwards moves their body forward, while the return stroke tends to oppose forward motion. Reducing drag on the return stroke is essential for efficiency. For example, ducks paddle through the water spreading the webs of their feet for the power stroke, and pull their webs together to reduce the pull of water forward on the return stroke. The legs of water beetles have hairs which spread out to catch and move water back in the power stroke, but lay flat for the return stroke. Also, one side of a water beetle leg is wider than the others and is held perpendicular to the motion when pushing backward, but the leg rotates when the limb returns forward, so the thinner side catches less water. Drag swimming is less efficient than lift-powered swimming.

Semi-aquatic animals experience more drag than fully aquatic animals. Design that allows them to function out of the water limits the efficiency possible to be reached when in the water. In water swimming at the surface exposes them to resistive wave drag and is associated with a higher cost than submerged swimming. Swimming below the surface exposes them to resistance due to return strokes and pressure, but primarily friction. Frictional drag is due to fluid viscosity and body morphology. Pressure drag is due to the difference of water flow around the body and is also affected by body morphology. The fur of otters and beavers, for example, is useful on land but decreases streamlining and creates additional drag. The platypus may be a good example of an intermediate between drag and lift swimmers because it has a rowing mechanism similar to lift-based pectoral oscillation. The limbs of semi-aquatic organisms are reserved for use on land and using them in water not only increases the cost of locomotion, but limits them to drag-based modes. Although they are less efficient, drag swimmers are able to produce more thrust at low speeds than lift swimmers. They are also thought to be more maneuverable due to the large thrust produced.

=== Buoyancy ===
Many aquatic/marine organisms have developed organs to compensate for their weight and control their buoyancy in the water. These structures make the density of their bodies very close to that of the surrounding water. Some hydrozoans, such as siphonophores, have gas-filled floats; the Nautilus, Sepia, and Spirula (Cephalopods) have chambers of gas within their shells; and most teleost fish and many lantern fish (Myctophidae) are equipped with swim bladders. Many aquatic and marine organisms may also be composed of low-density materials. Deep-water teleosts, which do not have a swim bladder, have few lipids and proteins, deeply ossified bones, and watery tissues that maintain their buoyancy. Some sharks' livers are composed of low-density lipids, such as hydrocarbon squalene or wax esters (also found in Myctophidae without swim bladders), which provide buoyancy.

Swimming animals that are denser than water must generate lift or adapt a benthic lifestyle. Movement of the fish to generate hydrodynamic lift is necessary to prevent sinking. Often, their bodies act as hydrofoils, a task that is more effective in flat-bodied fish. At a small tilt angle, the lift is greater for flat fish than it is for fish with narrow bodies. Narrow-bodied fish use their fins as hydrofoils while their bodies remain horizontal. In sharks, the heterocercal tail shape drives water downward, creating a counteracting upward force while thrusting the shark forward. The lift generated is assisted by the pectoral fins and upward-angle body positioning. It is supposed that tunas primarily use their pectoral fins for lift.

Buoyancy maintenance is metabolically expensive. Growing and sustaining a buoyancy organ, adjusting the composition of biological makeup, and exerting physical strain to stay in motion demands large amounts of energy. It is proposed that lift may be physically generated at a lower energy cost by swimming upward and gliding downward, in a "climb and glide" motion, rather than constant swimming on a plane.

=== Temperature ===
Temperature can greatly affect the ability of aquatic organisms to move through water. This is because temperature not only affects the properties of the water, but also the organisms in the water, as most have an ideal range specific to their body and metabolic needs. Q10 (temperature coefficient), the factor by which a rate increases at a 10 °C increase in temperature, is used to measure how organisms' performance relies on temperature. Most have increased rates as water becomes warmer, but some have limits to this and others find ways to alter such effects, such as by endothermy or earlier recruitment of faster muscle.

For example, Crocodylus porosus, or estuarine crocodiles, were found to increase swimming speed from 15 °C to 23 °C and then to have peak swimming speed from 23 °C to 33 °C. However, performance began to decline as temperature rose beyond that point, showing a limit to the range of temperatures at which this species could ideally perform.

=== Submergence ===
The more of the animal's body that is submerged while swimming, the less energy it uses. Swimming on the surface requires two to three times more energy than when completely submerged. This is because of the bow wave that is formed at the front when the animal is pushing the surface of the water when swimming, creating extra drag.

== Secondary evolution ==
Some terrestrial animals among the tetrapods and the insects have secondarily adapted to life in water, including evolving adaptations to aquatic locomotion.

=== Aquatic tetrapods ===
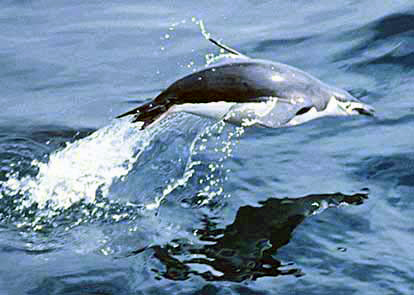
Chinstrap penguin leaping over water

While tetrapods lost many of their natural adaptations to swimming when they evolved onto the land, many have re-evolved the ability to swim or have indeed returned to a completely aquatic lifestyle. Primarily or exclusively aquatic animals have re-evolved from terrestrial tetrapods multiple times: examples include amphibians such as newts, reptiles such as crocodiles, snakes, sea turtles, and ichthyosaurs, marine mammals such as whales, and birds such as penguins.

=== Aquatic insects ===
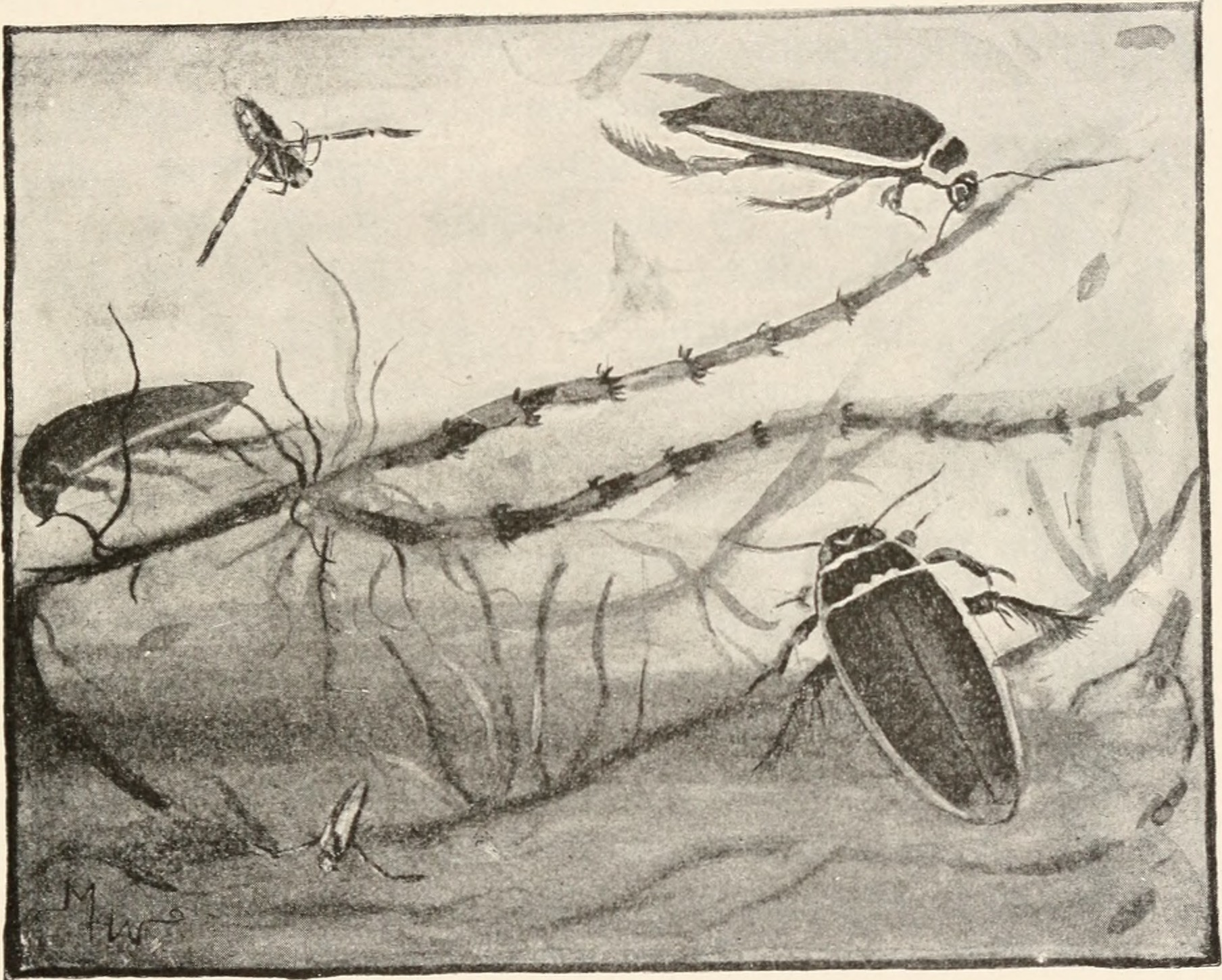
Diving beetles and backswimmers have legs adapted as rowing oars for swimming.

Among invertebrates, aquatic insects include water boatmen and diving beetles, which have adapted their hind legs for use as rowing oars for swimming. In the beetles, one pair of legs is so modified; among the water boatmen (corixid bugs), two pairs of legs have scoop- or oar-shaped tarsi.

=== Human swimming ===
In 2013, the scholar of human evolution Pedro Renato Bender proposed that the swimming instinct was lost as a consequence of constraints related to arboreal life in the last common ancestor of apes. This has been called the Saci last common ancestor hypothesis, after Saci, a Brazilian folklore character who cannot cross water. Bender hypothesized that the ancestral ape increasingly avoided deep-water bodies when the risks of being exposed to water were clearly higher than the advantages of crossing them. A decreasing contact with water bodies could then have led to the disappearance of the doggy paddle instinct.

Swimming has been known amongst humans since prehistoric times; the earliest record of swimming dates back to Stone Age paintings from around 7,000 years ago. Competitive swimming started in Europe around 1800 and was part of the first modern 1896 Summer Olympics in Athens, though not in a form comparable to the contemporary events. It was not until 1908 that regulations were implemented by the International Swimming Federation to produce competitive swimming.

== See also ==
- Animal locomotion
- Fish fin
- Terrestrial locomotion
- Tradeoffs for locomotion in air and water
- Undulatory locomotion
- Aerial locomotion in marine animals
