= Command neuron =

A command neuron is an interneuron whose excitation is both necessary and sufficient to evoke a behavior. These criteria are often tested by:

1. Recording the activity of the command neuron during stimulus presentation that triggers a given behavior.
2. Showing that the behavior cannot be evoked after removal of the command neuron (necessary).
3. Stimulation of the command neuron can elicit the behavior (sufficient). In some cases, a group of interneurons together form a command system while the individual members, known as command-like neurons, may not satisfy both the necessity and sufficiency criteria.

== History ==
The term command neuron first appeared in a 1964 paper titled "Interneurons Commanding Swimmeret Movements in the Crayfish", by CAG Wiersma and K Ikeda in volume 12 of Comparative Biochemistry and Physiology vol 12 on pp 509–525 Wiersma and Ikeda used the term to describe how a single action potential in any of the four giant fibers that run along the dorsal margin of the crayfish nerve cord caused the crayfish to execute a tail-flip escape response. This concept came to epitomize the general neurobiological principle that complex information can be encoded on the level of individual neurons. Soon, researchers were finding command neurons in multiple invertebrate and vertebrate species, including crickets, cockroaches, lobsters, and teleost fish.

== Criticism ==
In 1978, Kupfermann and Weiss' "The Command Neuron Concept" proposed a more rigorous definition of the command neuron than had previously been used. They suggested that for any neuron to qualify as a command neuron, its activity had to be both necessary and sufficient for the initiation of the behavior it was purported to command. The article initiated a torrent of tumultuous debate about which neurons, if any, could fit the new, more rigorous definition proposed by Kupfermann and Weiss.

== Modern view ==
Many believe that the command neuron concept needs to be reworked in light of the subtleties uncovered by Kupfermann and Weiss' careful methodology. Even the Mauthner cell, an archetypal command cell, has been criticized as being neither necessary nor sufficient for the initiation of the C-start response it supposedly governs. Command decisions are increasingly seen as being governed by networks of interacting and redundant cells, not simply by single neurons. Critics believe that the less restrictive category of "command-like" neurons would repair the flaws in the overly strict Kupfermann and Weiss definition while more accurately classifying the role of single neurons in command decisions.

Despite Kupfermann and Weiss' scathing critique of the relative fashion with which the command neuron concept was being used in the late 1970s and the resultant abandonment of the concept by some, the command neuron concept is still extant in the most current neurobiological literature. Some accept the revisionist "command-like" neuron concept—believing that no neurons exist which can satisfy the strictures outlined in "The Command Neuron Concept" to embed neurons inclusively. Others cling to the use of the original command neuron concept as useful, rejecting the Kupfermann and Weiss strictures, and using less stringent definitions of the term (most seem to believe that there is a spectrum of pre-motor command organization: from parallel distributed networks on the one end, to command neurons on the other).

== See also ==
- Neuroethology
