= Ludwig Mauthner =

Austrian neuroanatomist and ophthalmologist

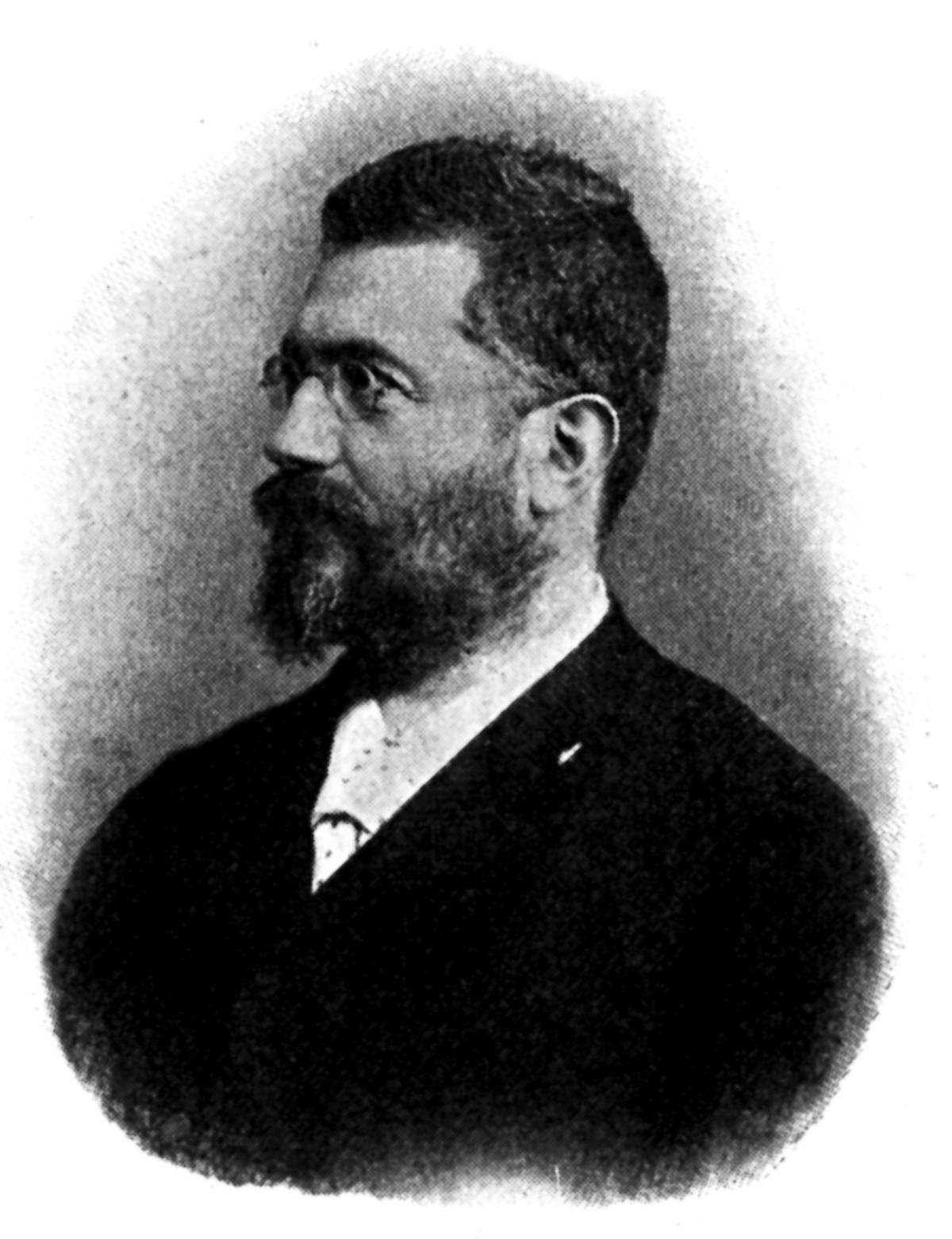
Ludwig Mauthner (1840-1894)

Ludwig Mauthner (13 April 1840 – 20 October 1894) was an Austrian neuroanatomist and ophthalmologist who was a native of Prague.

== Life ==
Mauthner was born on 13 April 1840 in Prague, Bohemia, Austrian Empire. The son of Jewish parents, he studied medicine at the University of Vienna, where he received his doctorate in 1861. In 1864 he was a privatdozent of ophthalmology, later becoming a professor at the University of Innsbruck (1869). In 1877 he resigned his position at Innsbruck, afterwards returning to Vienna as a lecturer. Later he was appointed assistant director of the Allgemeine Poliklinik, and in 1894 attained the chair of ophthalmology at the university.

In 1859, while still a student, Mauthner described a fibrous structure in the spinal cord of fishes that contained two large cell bodies in the animals' metencephalon. These cells were to become known as Mauthner cells, and are known to exist in amphibians as well as in fish. Mauthner cells have large-diameter axons that run down the length of the spinal cord.

Mauthner wrote numerous treatises in the field of ophthalmology, including Die sympathischen Augenleiden, a book that was translated into English in 1881 as The sympathetic diseases of the eye. He was also the first to describe choroideremia.

== Additional eponyms ==
- Mauthner's sheath: The plasma membrane of an axon; also known as an axolemma.
- Mauthner's test: A test formerly used for color perception.

== Selected writings ==
- Lehrbuch der Ophthalmoskopie, Wien 1868.
- Recherches sur la Structure du Système Nerveux, Paris 1868.
- Die Syphilitischen Erkrankungen des Auges, in: Hermann von Zeissl's "Lehrbuch der Augenheilkunde", 1873.
- Die Sympathischen Augenleiden, Wiesbaden 1879.
- Die Lehre vom Glaukom, Wiesbaden 1882.
- Die Nuclearlähmung der Augenmuskeln, Wiesbaden 1885.
- Die nicht Nuclearen Augenmuskellähmungen, Wiesbaden 1886.
- Die Lehre von den Augenmuskellähmungen, Wiesbaden 1889.
