= Decapod anatomy =

Entire structure of a decapod crustacean

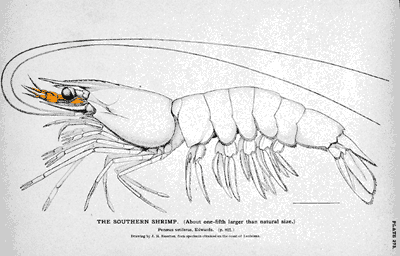
Antennules

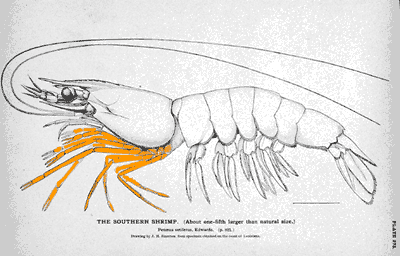
Pereiopods

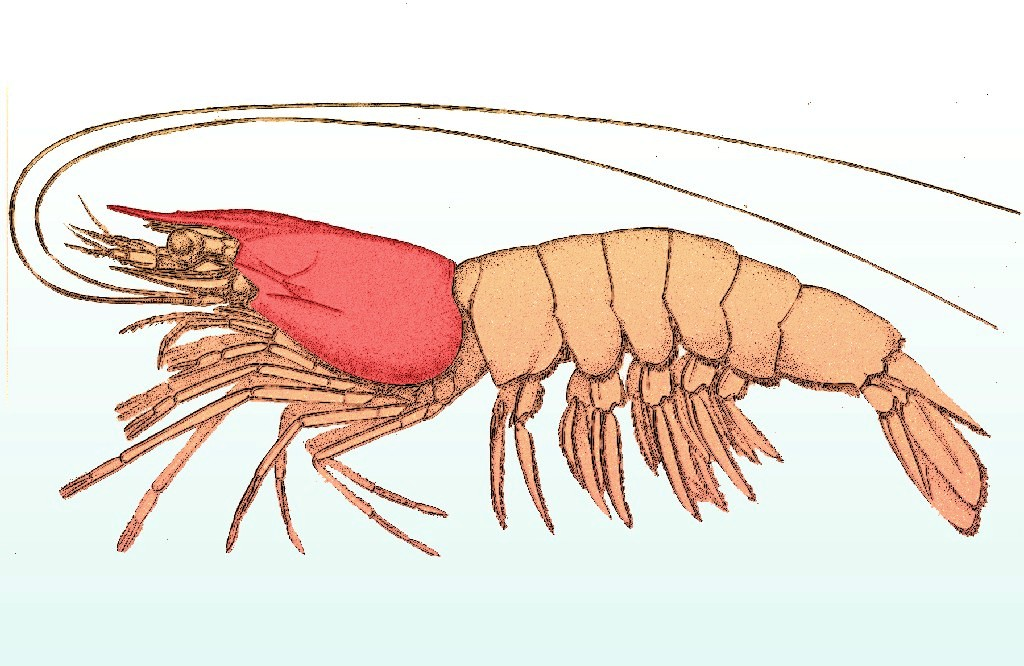
Carapace

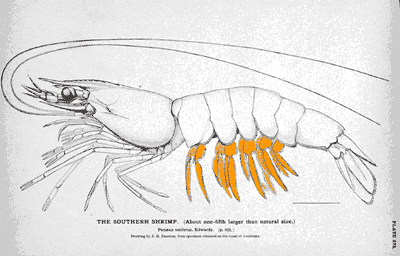
Pleopods

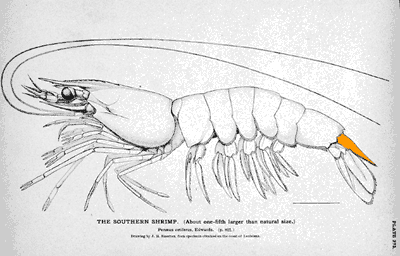
Telson

The anatomy of a decapod consists of 20 body segments grouped into two main body parts: the cephalothorax and the pleon (abdomen). Each segment – often called a somite – may possess one pair of appendages, although in various groups these may be reduced or missing.

== Cephalothorax ==
=== Head ===
1. antennules
2. antennae
3. mandibles
4. first maxillae
5. second maxillae

The head also bears the (usually stalked) compound eyes. The distal portion of a mandible or maxilla which has a sensory function is known as a palp.

=== Thorax / pereon ===
1. first maxillipeds
2. second maxillipeds
3. third maxillipeds
4. first pereiopods
5. second pereiopods
6. third pereiopods
7. fourth pereiopods
8. fifth pereiopods

Maxillipeds are appendages modified to function as mouthparts. Particularly in the less advanced decapods, these can be very similar to the pereiopods. Pereiopods are primarily walking legs and are also used for gathering food. They are also the ten legs from which decapods take their name. Those pereiopods which are armed with a claw (chela) may be referred to as chelipeds. The moveable fingers of a claw are known as dactyli. The pereiopods bear the sexual organs, which are the third pereiopod in the female and the fifth pereiopod in the male. Each appendage from the second maxilla to the fifth pereiopod also bears a gill. In the Anomura (hermit crabs and related animals), the fifth pair of pereiopods is often hidden inside the branchial chamber, where they are used to clean the gills. The cephalothorax is covered by a carapace which protects the internal organs and the gills; the section of the carapace that projects in front of the eyes is called the rostrum.

== Abdomen / pleon ==
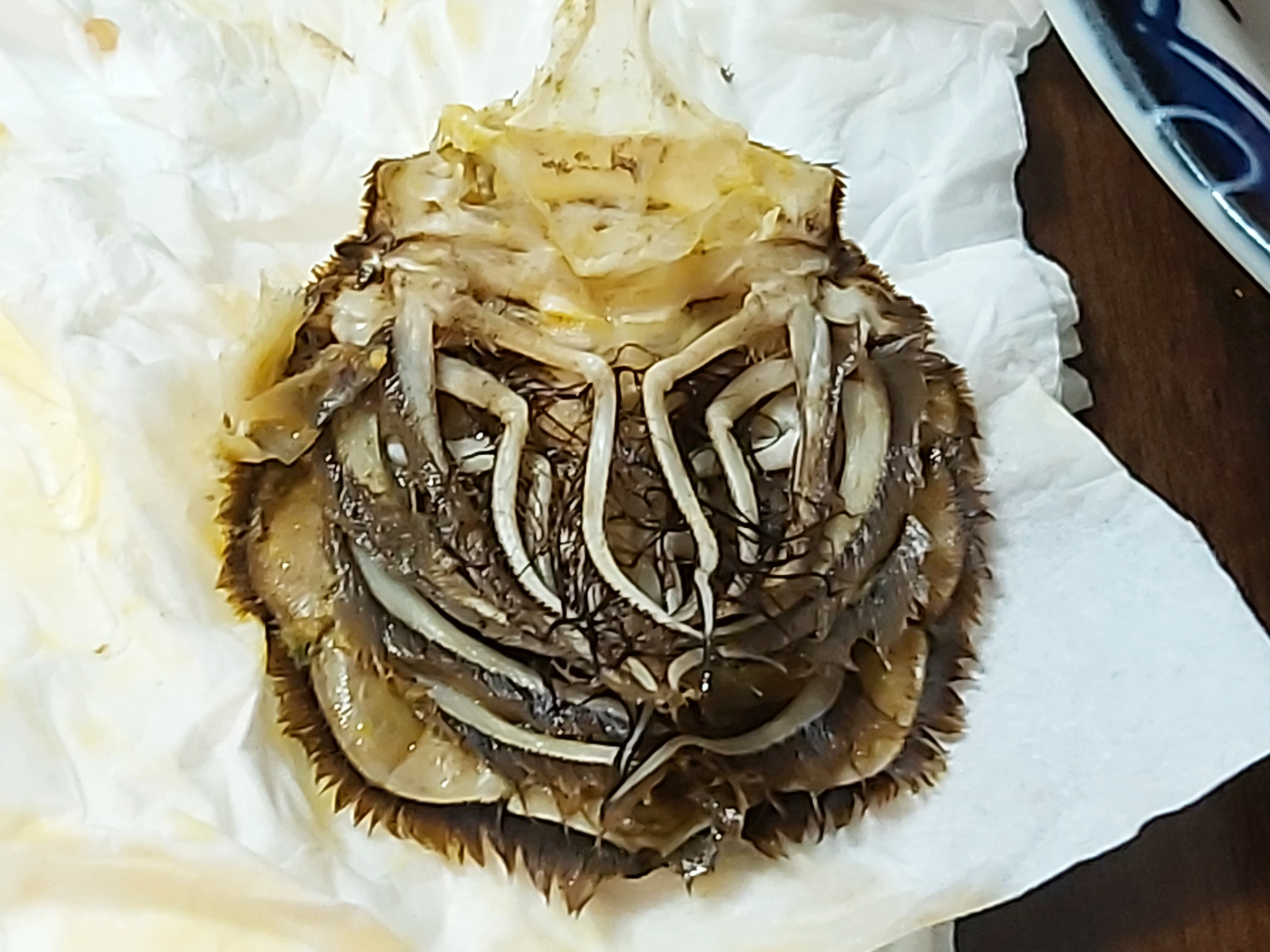
Folded abdomen of a cooked crab severed from its body, showing its pleopods hiding beneath.

1. first pleopods
2. second pleopods
3. third pleopods
4. fourth pleopods
5. fifth pleopods
6. uropods

Pleopods (also called swimmerets) are primarily swimming legs, and are also used for brooding the eggs (except in prawns), catching food (then swept to the mouth), and can sometimes bear their own gills. In some taxa, the first one or two pairs of pleopods are specialised in the males for fertilisation, and are referred to as the gonopods.

== Telson ==
At the end of the pleon is the tail fan, comprising a pair of biramous uropods and the telson, which bears the anus. Together, they are used for steering while swimming, and in the caridoid escape reaction.

In crabs and some other carcinised decapods, the abdomen is folded under the cephalothorax.

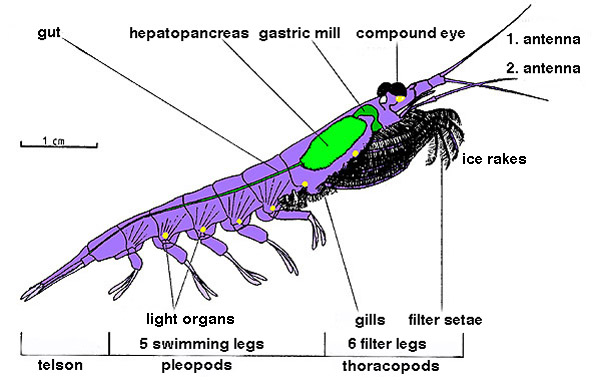
The anatomy of krill, using Euphausia superba as a model.

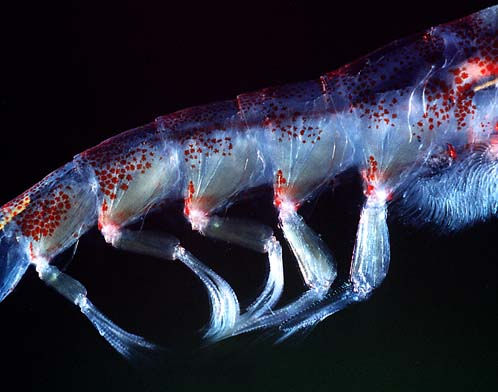
The pleopods of Euphausia superba.

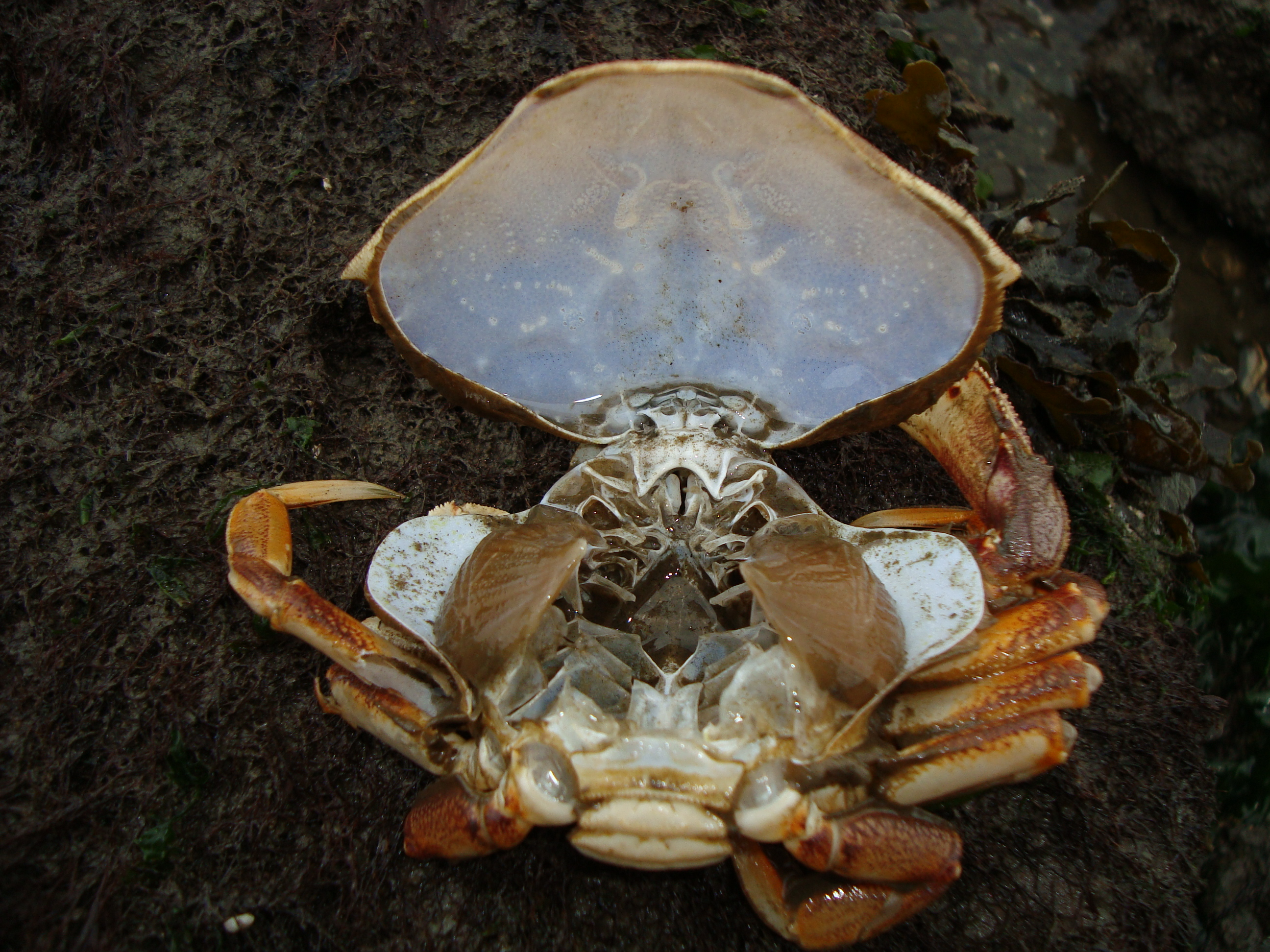
Crab moult with carapace lifted, exposing gills.

== See also ==
- Arthropod leg
- Appendage
