= Squid giant axon =

Nerve fiber in the water-jet propulsion system in squid

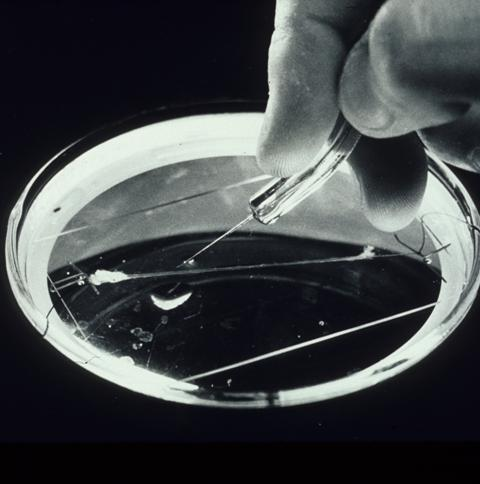
Squid giant axon

The squid giant axon is the very large (up to 1.5 mm in diameter; typically around 0.5 mm) axon that controls part of the water jet propulsion system in squid. It was first described by L. W. Williams in 1909, but this discovery was forgotten until English zoologist and neurophysiologist J. Z. Young demonstrated the axon's function in the 1930s while working in the Stazione Zoologica in Naples, the Marine Biological Association in Plymouth and the Marine Biological Laboratory in Woods Hole. Squids use this system primarily for making brief but very fast movements through the water.

On the underside of the squid's body, between the head and the mantle, is a siphon through which water can be rapidly expelled by the fast contractions of the body wall muscles of the animal. This contraction is initiated by action potentials in the giant axon. Action potentials travel faster in an axon with a large diameter than a smaller one, and squid have evolved the giant axon to improve the speed of their escape response. The increased radius of the squid axon decreases the internal resistance of the axon, as resistance is inversely proportional to the cross sectional area of the object. This increases the space constant ($\lambda = \sqrt{(r \times \rho_{m})/(2 \times \rho_{i})}$), leading to faster local depolarization and a faster action potential conduction ($E = E_o e^{-x / \lambda}$).

In their Nobel Prize–winning work uncovering ionic mechanism of action potentials, Alan Hodgkin and Andrew Huxley performed experiments on the squid giant axon, using the longfin inshore squid as the model organism. The prize was shared with John Eccles. The large diameter of the axon provided a great experimental advantage for Hodgkin and Huxley as it allowed them to insert voltage clamp electrodes inside the lumen of the axon.

While the squid axon is very large in diameter, it is unmyelinated, which decreases the conduction velocity substantially. The conduction velocity of a typical 0.5 mm squid axon is about 25 m/s. During a typical action potential in the cuttlefish Sepia giant axon, an influx of 3.7 pmol/cm^{2} (picomoles per centimeter^{2}) of sodium is offset by a subsequent efflux of 4.3 pmol/cm^{2} of potassium.

== See also ==
- Lateral giant neuron
- Squid giant synapse
- Hodgkin–Huxley model
