= Caridoid escape reaction =

Innate escape mechanism by crustaceans

Animated representation of lobstering.

The caridoid escape reaction, also known as lobstering or tail-flipping, is an innate escape behavior in marine and freshwater eucarid crustaceans such as lobsters, krill, shrimp and crayfish.

The reaction, most extensively researched in crayfish, allows crustaceans to escape predators through rapid abdominal flexions that produce powerful thrusts that make the crustacean quickly swim backwards through the water and away from danger. The type of response depends on the part of the crustacean stimulated, but this behavior is complex and is regulated both spatially and temporally through the interactions of several neurons.

== Discovery of the first command neuron-mediated behavior ==
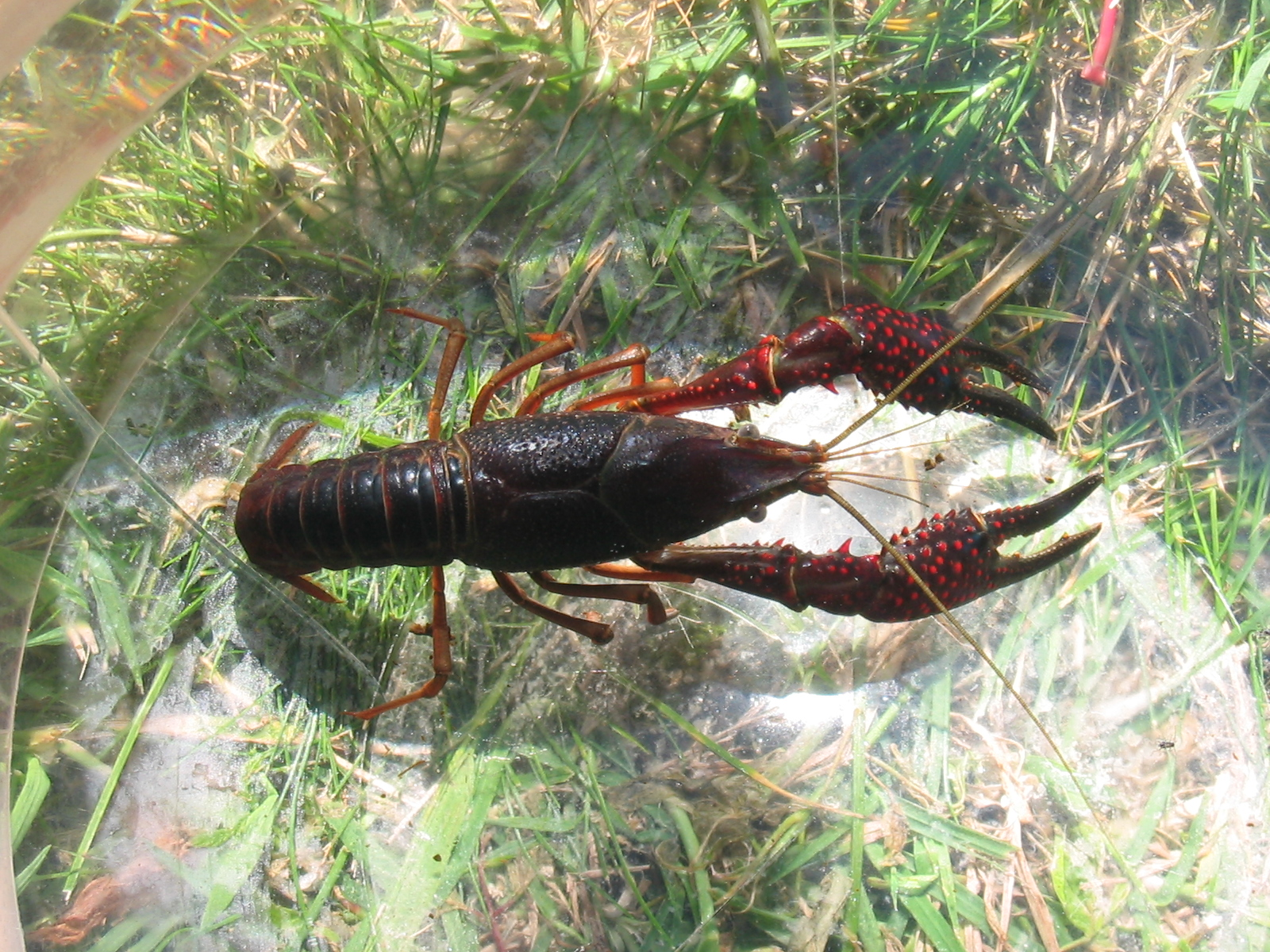
The tail-flip escape behavior was first described in the crayfish Procambarus clarkii

In 1946, C. A. G. Wiersma first described the tail-flip escape in the crayfish Procambarus clarkii and noted that the giant interneurons present in the tail were responsible for the reaction. The aforementioned neuronal fibres consist of a pair of lateral giant interneurons and a pair of medial giant interneurons, and Wiersma found that stimulating just one lateral giant interneuron (LG or LGI) or one medial giant interneuron (MG or MGI) would result in the execution of a tail flip. Wiersma and K. Ikeda then proposed the term "command neuron" in their 1964 publication, and applied it to the giant interneuron's ability to command the expression of the escape response. This was the first description of a command neuron-mediated behavior and it indicated that the depolarization of a neuron could precipitate complex innate behaviors in some organisms.

This concept was further fleshed out with more specific and stringent conditions in 1972 when Kupfermann and Weiss published The Command Neuron Concept. The paper stated that command neurons were neurons (or small sets of neurons) carrying the entire command signal for a natural behavioral response. According to the authors, command neurons were both necessary and sufficient in the production of a behavioral response. The concept of command neuron-mediated behaviors was both ground breaking and controversial, since determining command neuron-mediated behaviors was a problematic process due to difficulties in understanding and interpreting anatomical and behavioral data.

== Research with crayfish ==
Behavioral neurobiologists in the field of neuroethology have researched this behavior extensively for over fifty years in the crayfish species Procambarus clarkii. Based on studies of P. clarkii it was discovered that the tail-flip mechanism is characterized by a decisive, all-or-nothing quality that inhibits all unnecessary behaviors while generating a fixed action pattern for escape swimming. The type of escape response depends on the region of the crayfish that is stimulated but all forms require abdominal contractions. When a strong, unpleasant tactile stimulus is presented, such as a burst of water or the prod of a probe, a stereotyped behavior occurs in which the muscular tail and wide tail fan region of the telson are used like a paddle to propel the crustacean away from harm using powerful abdominal flexions. The entire process occurs in a fraction of a second as movements are generated within two hundredths of a second (20 milliseconds) from the original trigger stimulus and the period of latency after a flexion is a hundredth of a second (10 milliseconds). Finally, the caridoid escape reflex requires that neurons be able to complete the arduous task of synchronizing the flexion of several abdominal segments. The speed, coordination, and decisiveness of the process seem to be the main attributes to its success.

=== Anatomy involved ===
Like other decapod crustaceans, the crayfish possesses a hard, segmented exoskeleton that reflects muscular and neural segmentation. The anterior portion of the crayfish is the cephalothorax region. The region rostral to the cephalic groove, which separates the head and thorax region, is characterized by the presence of eyes, antennae and claws while the region caudal contains four pairs of walking legs. This is the crayfish's primary mode of locomotion. The abdominal section of the crayfish is divided into seven segments. These segments are flexibly interconnected, forming the tail. Normally, the tail is held in an extended position to aid in maneuvering and balancing. The first five segments are similar and the two terminal segments are modified into a tail fan, a region with high surface area that acts as the blade of a paddle in the escape response. This region contains the telson. The abdominal segments contain swimmerets, which aid in swimming.

The anterior five segments of the crayfish house the massive flexor and extensor muscles. Six abdominal ganglia run down the entire length of the abdomen and communicate with one another through projections. The first five abdominal segments each have their own ganglion, that contains three roots with outward projections. The first has mixed sensory and motor nerves innervating swimmerets while the second has sensory and motor neurons that innervate the extensor muscles, while the third root contains only motor neuron projections that extend into the flexor muscles. The last segment contains the fusion of two ganglia. The ganglia here also receive sensory input from the sensitive hairs on the tail fan.

Each ganglion contains the body of one motor giant neuron (MoG), powerful and large bodied motor neurons whose projections innervate the five fast flexor (FF) muscles found in a segment and interact with them through chemical synapses. The ganglia also contain two sets of giant axons known as the lateral giant neurons and the medial giant neurons. These interneurons play important roles in escape swimming. Their large diameter allows for rapid conduction since there is less current leakage. Their projections extend through the third root in each ganglion, and Furshpan and Potter found that the synapses they subsequently made with the MoG passed depolarizing currents in a direct and unidirectional manner. These electrical synapses account for the speed of the escape mechanism and display some features of chemical synapses such as LTP and LTD. Variations in escape response characteristic depend on the location where the crayfish body is prodded or attacked and also depend on which of the giant neurons is stimulated.

=== Response variants and their circuitry ===
==== Medial giant-mediated escape ====
The medial giants innervate the entire ventral nerve cord. Their cell bodies and dendrites begin in the brain and collect sensory information presented by visual and tactile stimuli. These fibers terminate in the last abdominal segment. The response is triggered by abrupt tactile stimuli to the head or alarming visual stimuli. This results in the firing of all motor giant (MoG) neurons and the flexion of all the phasic fast flexor (FF) muscles in the abdomen, which rapidly curls the tail fan and last three segments underneath the crayfish. This produces a thrust that directs water towards the offending stimulus while propelling the crayfish directly backward. This behavior is then followed by the extension of the tail, which prepares it for swimming or the execution of another tail-flip.

Unfortunately, this variant of the tail-flip escape has not been extensively studied. Further studies should focus on this escape variant, paying special attention to exactly how visual information is processed and then converted into neuronal signals that produce a tail flip response.

==== Non-giant escape ====
Less abrupt or gradually intensifying stimuli evoke locomotion behavior similar to that seen in giant interneuron-mediated behaviors. However, the movements are less stereotyped and do not appear to occur in an all or nothing manner. They are so named because they lack the involvement of the giant interneurons, most likely because they do not produce depolarizations in the sensory neurons that are above the thresholds required to initiate these behaviors. Instead they involve one or a few of the smaller neurons innervating the tail. The latency periods for these escape mechanisms are longer, ranging from 80 to 500 ms. However, this slower swimming behavior allows for flexibility, since the crayfish can use visual stimuli and steer itself in a selected direction.

Non-giant escape often occurs during situations where lateral or medial giant-mediated escape may not be beneficial or during times where those behaviors are suppressed. This allows the crayfish to attack offenders, escape during feeding, or wriggle free when it has been restrained by the carapace.

Non-giant escape circuitry was found to be activated more during frontal attacks, but was rarely involved in the initial escape during a rear attack. Non-giant escape is often used after an initial giant interneuron-mediated tail flip. Compared to MG escape, the potentials produced in the MoG neurons by non-giant circuitry have lower amplitudes and longer durations while the recordings in the FF muscles are more erratic and have smaller amplitudes since they receive smaller EPSPs from the MoGs. So while it is hard to observe differences in MG and non-escapes, this property can be used to distinguish the two.

==== Lateral giant-mediated escape ====
The lateral giant (LG)-mediated escape mechanism is the most extensively analyzed form of the tail flip. The LG is not actually one neuron, but rather a group of closely associated neurons arranged end to end and connected by electrical synapses (also called septate synapses). As a result, the LGI functions as one giant, continuous neuron, such as the MG. The LGI's large diameter and the efficiency and speed of electrical synapses, make the LGI-mediated escape especially rapid and effective. The LGI only innervates the first three rostral segments of the tail and is activated within 10 ms from when a mechanical stimulus is presented to the abdomen. When flexion occurs, only the first three segments flex and the tail fan is not directed under the body and forward but rather straight down. The unflexed segments increase the length of the paddle. The result is the rear end of the animal is directed upward and forward causing the animal to tumble or somersault forward. The tail is then rapidly extended, and this is usually followed by directed swimming.

The LGI is one of the few examples of a true command neuron. It passes the necessity and sufficiency principle put forward by Kupfermann and Weiss. Wiersma's initial experiments showed that direct stimulation of the LGI was a sufficient release for the tail flip. In 1981, it was Olson and Krasne who showed that the LGI fulfilled the condition of necessity, because when spikes were inhibited in the LGI through introducing a hyperpolarizing current, no motor activity was produced in response to a stimulus that would have originally elicited the tail flip.

The LGI contains the following three phases, occurring over the span of about 100 ms:

===== 1 – Flexion production =====
The LGI receives its sensory input from the hair-like projections found on the edge of the tail fan. The sensory information is sent from bipolar receptors connected to the hair that are directionally sensitive. The path of the signal varies from here depending on the strength of the input. In the beta pathway, the signal can then pass a chemical synapse, the information is sent to a sensory interneuron (SI) of either type A (which fires phasically in response to input) or type C, (which fire tonically). From there, the signal is sent across an electrical synapse to the LGI. The LGI can also receive the sensory input directly through an electrical synapse by way of the alpha pathway. This bypasses the SIs. The LGI can pass the signal to the MoG's by two paths one of which passes the signal to the Motor Giant through direct electrical synapses. The MoG then passes the signal to the FF muscles. It can also use a second route across a fast electrical synapse to a premotor interneuron called the segmental giant (SG), two of which are located in each segment. The SGs then relays the signal to fast flexor motor neurons. The end result is a powerful and rapid flexion.

The convergence many inputs on the LGI and divergence of few signals show how the LGI functions as a decision making coincidence detector. It takes the information from both the alpha and the beta pathways and if the timing of the spikes is synchronous, the behavior is produced. If the timing is asynchronous, the later input is blocked by reducing the driving force of the signal and increasing the threshold voltage. The early synapse also causes current to leak through the active synapse, resulting in weak EPSPs that are ultimately unable to generate the tail flip.

A number of processes are inhibited once the initial flexion has begun. Further LGI spiking, influx of sensory information from the tail, MoG spiking and FF contraction are all inhibited so that a flexion and extension cycle can be completed before another flexion begins. Long IPSPs are generated to prevent these events. The extensor muscles are inhibited to prevent competition between the extensor and flexors. Rapid IPSPs presented at the muscle receptor organ (MRO) prevent the stretch receptor from initiating extension while they are also presented at the fast extensor motor neurons and the fast extensor muscles. The circuits responsible for slow flexion and extension are also inhibited.

===== 2 – Re-extension =====
When the LGI-mediated inhibition subsides, the re-extension process begins. This process is mediated by the MRO and tail fan hair receptors, which were inhibited during the flexion portion of the escape behavior. The MRO is responsible for the initiation of extension and the inhibition of flexion through a reflex like mechanism. The muscle fibers of the MRO are located on the dorsal side of the abdomen, each spanning the joint of two segments. They are innervated by proprioreceptors that detect the stretch in extensor muscles when the flexors are contracted. They then fire phasically or tonically. It then excites the motor neurons in the fast extensor muscles while directly exciting an inhibitory neuron that prevents contractions in the FF muscles. The hair cells detect the resulting movement caused by the tail flip when activated, they would fire and excite the fast extensor motor neurons.

===== 3 – Swimming =====
Non-giant-mediated responses are initiated after the tail flip, creating cycles of flexion followed by extension. This non-giant system is activated parallel to the LGI circuit when the hair cells receive input. However, this behavior has a longer delay that allows the onset of swimming to occur after the completion of the tail flip. The non-giant swimming occurs independently of the LGI response since direct stimulation of the LGI with the electrodes results in a tail flip but not the subsequent non-giant swimming. This swimming response seems to be a fixed action pattern mediated by a central pattern generator since it does not require sensory feedback for physical and temporal maintenance.

==== Eating ====
Crayfish often find themselves in a conflicting situation where they are performing the highly motivated behavior of feeding when they suddenly receive a tail flip stimulus. Often, the crayfish will not perform a tail flip in this situation. This is because when a crayfish is actively feeding, the LGI itself is modulated by the behavior. Feeding increases the threshold for the tail flip, and even when the tail is tapped, no spikes are initiated. As a result, it takes an especially strong stimulus to elicit the tail flip. This prevents the crayfish from going hungry unless it is absolutely necessary.

==== Carapace restraint ====
When a crayfish is held by its carapace either in the water or in the air, it does not respond with a tail flip when it receives sensory stimuli that would normally elicit the response. This inhibitory behavior does not seem to be mediated by the abdomen. When the thorax-abdomen junction is severed, the inhibitory effect is lost and the LGI in severed abdomen generates strong spikes since its threshold had decreased substantially. This is an indication that the behavior is mediated in the brain or the thorax of the crayfish. Most non-giant and MGI tail flips are also suppressed by restraint, so only a few non-giant systems are active to allow the crayfish to carefully wriggle free. The setup of this system seems to be designed to prevent the unnecessary use of all or nothing tail flips or ineffective tail flips when the situation requires more careful maneuvering.

The tail flip normally induces inhibition in an absolute fashion, such that it takes precedence over all the other tasks the segments are performing. However, during these situations, the effectiveness of the tail flip is reduced, so the inhibitory processes need to occur in a relative manner and a tail flip should occur only if absolutely necessary. During absolute inhibition is directed by more proximal synapses controlling the spike-initiating zones of the LGI. It is most likely that during restraint or feeding, the inhibitory process is mediated by inhibitory synaptic input on distal dendrites of the LGI . As a result, these signals would have to compete with other inputs for the control of the LGI.

==== Learning ====
Repeated tapping of the abdomen leads to habituation of the tail flip mechanism. However, self–habituation is prevented by command neuron–derived inhibition because when a tail flip is begun, the mechanisms that induce habituation are repressed. The habituation occurs at the level of the A type and C type interneurons, which experience synaptic depression. The habituation process is also mediated further up the circuit through the buildup of tonic inhibition, brought on by the repeated stimulation.

==== Social status ====
The feedback from social situations affect a crayfish's ability to perform a tail flip. Serotonin levels are affected by social status. High levels are associated with aggressive behavior and a reduction in the frequency of tail flips performed. This is because the excitability of the LGI is decreased. Aggressive dominant males have a moderate reduction in tail flips while the subordinates have a much lower occurrence of tail flips. This presents a paradox since this means that subordinates are more likely to get killed. However, it was found that subordinates are more likely to use non-giant-mediated escape, indicating that the reduction in tail flips and enhancement of non giant escape is adaptive.

Changes in social status should correlate with changes in serotonin levels, resulting in changes in the escape strategies used by the crayfish. However this is only true when submissive crayfish become dominant, and not the reverse. The neuromodulatory processes of facilitation and inhibition seem to be mediated by different cell receptors. Differences in the effects of serotonin on the behavior of the crayfish seem to be the result of differences in the populations of these receptors. It is unknown how these modulation processes convey the information to the LG, and how the behavioral changes are precipitated.

=== Evolution of the tail flip escape mechanism ===
It has been hypothesized that the tail flip is derived from an ancient limb protraction driven (as opposed to tail flexion-driven) mechanism. This is because the SGs appear to be modified limb motor neurons whose peripheral axons affect the legs and swimmerets, but end blindly without any known function. It is known that another effect of Giant Fiber excitation is limb promotion which suggests that the premotor limb interneurons may be ancestors of the Giant Fibers.

It has been speculated that the ancestral escape mechanism was most likely a backwards jump due to the simultaneous protraction of the legs driven by the ancestors of the Giant Fibers. This behavior was probably similar to the escape system found in a mantis shrimp called Squilla that diverged from the crayfish lineage very early on. It is likely that this mechanism was replaced by the tail flip since the wide surface area of the tail made this behavior more selectively advantageous. This most likely occurred when the ancestral flexor motor neurons in each segment formed connections with one of these limb motor neurons. The Squilla mechanism seems to be similar to this ancestral state because a large diameter axon in the dorsal nerve chord facilitates limb promoter motor neurons. This seems to match the ancestral condition, but it is not known for sure whether the circuitry is homologous.

== Etymology ==
Caridoid is derived from the Greek karis or καρίς (pronounced "kah-RISS"), shrimp or prawn, which is the root of the name of the taxonomic infraorder Caridea, a large group of crustaceans also known as the caridean shrimp.

== See also ==
- Coincidence detection in neurobiology
- Pain in crustaceans
