= Escape response =

Rapid series of movements by an animal

Escape response in Antarctic krill.

Escape response, escape reaction, or escape behavior is a mechanism by which animals avoid potential predation. It consists of a rapid sequence of movements, or lack of movement, that position the animal in such a way that allows it to hide, freeze, or flee from the supposed predator. Often, an animal's escape response is representative of an instinctual defensive mechanism, though there is evidence that these escape responses may be learned or influenced by experience.

The classical escape response follows this generalized, conceptual timeline: threat detection, escape initiation, escape execution, and escape termination or conclusion. Threat detection notifies an animal of a potential predator or otherwise dangerous stimulus, which provokes escape initiation through neural reflexes or more coordinated cognitive processes. Escape execution refers to the movement or series of movements that will hide the animal from the threat or will allow the animal to flee. Once the animal has effectively avoided the predator or threat, the escape response is terminated. Upon completion of the escape behavior or response, the animal may integrate the experience with its memory, allowing it to learn and adapt its escape response.

Escape responses are anti-predator behaviour that can vary from species to species. The behaviors themselves differ depending upon the species, but may include camouflaging techniques, freezing, or some form of fleeing (jumping, flying, withdrawal, etc.). In fact, variation between individuals is linked to increased survival. In addition, it is not merely increased speed that contributes to the success of the escape response; other factors, including reaction time and the individual's context can play a role. The individual escape response of a particular animal can vary based on an animal's previous experiences and its current state.

== Evolutionary importance ==
The ability to perform an effective escape maneuver directly affects the fitness of the animal, because the ability to evade predation enhances an animal's chance of survival. Those animals that learn to or are simply able to avoid predators have contributed to the wide variety of escape responses seen today. Animals that can adapt their responses in ways different from their own species have displayed increased rates of survival. Because of this, it is common for the individual escape response of an animal to vary according to reaction time, environmental conditions, and/or past and present experience.

Arjun Nair et al. found in 2017 that it is not necessarily the speed of the response itself, but the greater distance between the targeted individual and the predator when the response is executed. In addition, the escape response of an individual is directly related to the threat of the predator. Predators that pose the biggest risk to the population will evoke the greatest escape response. Therefore, it may be an adaptive trait selected for by natural selection.

Law and Blake argued in 1996 that many morphological characteristics could contribute to an individual's efficient escape response, but the escape response has undoubtedly been molded by evolution. In their study, they compared more recent sticklebacks to their ancestral form, the Paxton Lake stickleback, and found that the performance of the ancestral form was significantly lower. Therefore, one may conclude that this response has been ripened by evolution.

== Neurobiology ==
How the escape responses are initiated neurologically, and how the movements are coordinated is dependent on the species. The behaviors alone vary widely, so, in a similar manner, the neurobiology of the response can be highly variable between species.

'Simple' escape responses are commonly reflex movements that will quickly move the animal away from the potential threat. These neural circuits operate quickly and effectively, rapidly taking in sensory stimuli and initiating the escape behavior through well-defined neuron systems.

Complex escape responses often require a mixture of cognitive processes. This may stem from a difficult environment to escape from, or the animal having multiple potential escape methods. Initially, the animal must recognize the threat of predation, but following the initial recognition the animal might have to quickly determine the best route of escape, based on prior experience. This means rapid integration of incoming information with prior knowledge, and then coordination of motor movements deemed necessary. Complex escape responses generally require a more robust neural network.

Researchers will often evoke an escape response to test the potency of hormones and/or medication and their relationship to stress. As such, the escape response is fundamental to anatomical and pharmacological research.

== Role of learning ==
=== Habituation ===
A series of initially threatening encounters that do not lead to any true adverse outcomes for the animal can drive the development of habituation. Habituation is an adaptation strategy that refers to the diminishing response of an animal to a stimulus following repetitive exposures of the animal to that same stimulus. In other words, the animal learns to distinguish between innately threatening situations and may choose to not go through with their escape response. This is a highly variable phenomenon, where the stimulus itself is highly specific, and the experience is highly context dependent. This suggests that there is no one mechanism by which a species will develop habituation to a stimulus; instead habituation may arise from the integration of experiences. A number of cognitive processes may operate during one single threatening experience, but the levels at which these processes are integrated will determine how the individual animal will potentially respond next.

Caenorhabditis elegans, commonly identified as nematodes, have been used as a model species for studies observing their characteristic "tap-withdrawal response". The tapping on serves as the fear-provoking, mechanical stimulus which C. elegans worms will move away from. If the tapping stimulus continues without any direct effects on the worms, they will gradually stop responding to the stimulus. This response is modulated by a series of mechanosensory neurons (AVM, ALM, PVD, and PLM) which synapse with interneurons (AVD, AVA, AVB, and PVC) transmitting the signal to motor neurons that cause the back-and-forth movements. Habituation to the tapping reduces activity of the initial mechanosensory neurons, seen as a decrease in calcium channel activity and neurotransmitter release.

The primary force driving escape habituation is suspected to be energy conservation. If an animal learns that a certain threat will not actively cause harm to it, then the animal can choose to minimize its energy costs by not performing its escape. For example, zebrafish, who are habituated to predators, are more latent to flee than those who were not habituated to predators. However, habituation did not affect the fish's angle of escape from the predator.

=== Learned helplessness ===
If an animal cannot react via a startle or avoidance response, they will develop learned helplessness as a result of receiving or perceiving repeated threatening stimuli and believing the stimuli is unavoidable. The animal will submit and not react, even if the stimuli previously triggered instinctual responses or if the animal is provided an escape opportunity. In these situations, escape responses are not used because the animal has almost forgotten their innate response systems.

Helplessness is learned through habituation, because the brain is programmed to believe control is not present. In essence, animals operate under the assumption they have the free will to fight, flee or freeze as well as engage in other behaviors. When escape responses fail, they develop helplessness.

A common, theoretical example of learned helplessness is an elephant, trained by humans who condition the elephant to believe it cannot escape punishment. As a young elephant, it would be chained down with a pick to keep it from leaving. As it grows, the elephant would have the ability to easily overpower the tiny pick. Development of learned helplessness keeps the elephant from doing so, believing that it is trapped and the effort is futile.

In a more natural setting, learned helplessness would most often be displayed by animals that live in group settings. If food were scarce and one individual was always overpowered when it came time to get food, it would soon believe that no matter what it did, getting food would be impossible. It would have to find food on its own or submit to the idea that it would not eat.

== Startle response ==
Startle response is an unconscious response to sudden or threatening stimuli. In the wild, common examples would be sharp noises or quick movements. Because these stimuli are so harsh they are connected to a negative effect. This reflex causes a change in body posture, emotional state, or a mental shift to prepare for a specific motor task.

A common example would be cats and how, when startled, their arrector pili muscles contract, making the hair stand up and increasing their apparent size. Another example would be excessive blinking due to the contraction of the orbicularis oculi muscle when an object is rapidly moving toward an animal; this is often seen in humans.

Halichoerus grypus, or Grey seals, respond to acoustic startle stimuli by fleeing from the noise. The acoustic startle reflex is only activated when the noise is over eighty decibels, which promotes stress and anxiety responses that encourage flight.

=== Flight zone ===
Flight zone, flight initiation distance and escape distance are interchangeable terms which refer to the distance needed to keep an animal under the threshold that would trigger a startle response.

A flight zone can be circumstantial because a threat can vary in size (individually or in group number). Overall, this distance is the measure of an animal's willingness to take on risks. This differentiates a flight zone from personal distance an animal prefers and social distance (how close other species are willing to be).

An applicable analogy would be a reactive dog. When the flight zone is large, the dog will maintain an observant stance, but a startle response will not occur. As the threatening stimuli moves forward and decreases the flight zone, the dog will exhibit behaviors that fall into a startle or avoidance response.

== Avoidance response ==
The avoidance response is a form of negative reinforcement which is learned through operant conditioning. This response is usually beneficial, as it reduces risk of injury or death for animals, also because it is an adaptive response and can change as the species evolves. Individuals are able to recognize certain species or environments that need to be avoided, which can allow them to increase the flight distance to ensure safety.

When scared, octopus release ink to distract their predators enough that they can burrow into a safe area. Another example of avoidance is the fast-start response in fish. They can relegate musculoskeletal control which allows them to withdraw from the environment with the threatening stimuli. It is believed that the neural circuits have adapted over time to more quickly react to a stimulus. Interestingly, fish that keep to the same groups will be more reactive than those who are not.

== Examples ==
=== In birds ===
Avian species also display unique escape responses. Birds are uniquely vulnerable to human interference in the form of aircraft, drones, cars, and other technology. There has been a lot of interest in how these structures will and do affect the behaviors of terrestrial and aquatic birds.

One study by Michael A. Weston et al. in 2020 observed how flight initiation changed according to the distance of the drone from the birds. It was found that as the drone approached the tendency of birds to take flight to escape it increased dramatically. This was positively affected by the altitude at which the birds were exposed to the drone. In another experiment by Travis L. DeVault et al. in 1989, brown-headed cowbirds (Molothrus ater) were exposed to a demonstration of traffic traveling at speeds between 60–360 km/h. When approached by a vehicle travelling at 120 km/h, the birds only allotted 0.8s to escape before a possible collision. This study showed that fast traffic speeds may not allow enough time for birds to initiate an escape response.

=== In fish ===
In fish and amphibians, the escape response appears to be elicited by Mauthner cells, two giant neurons located in the rhombomere 4 of the hindbrain.

Generally, when faced with a dangerous stimulus, fish will contract their axial muscle, resulting in a C-shaped contraction away from the stimulus. This response occurs in two separate stages: a muscle contraction that allows them to speed away from a stimulus (stage 1), and a sequential contralateral movement (stage 2). This escape is also known as a "fast-start response". The majority of the fish respond to an external stimulus (pressure changes) within 5 to 15 milliseconds, while some will exhibit a slower response taking up to 80 milliseconds. While the escape response generally only propels the fish a small distance away, this distance is long enough to prevent predation. While many predators use water pressure to catch their prey, this short distance prevents them from feeding on the fish via suction.

Particularly in the case of fish, it has been hypothesized that the differences in escape response are due to the evolution of neural circuits over time. This can be witnessed by observing the difference in the extent of stage 1 behaviour, and the distinct muscle activity in stage 2 of the C-start or fast-start response.

In larval zebrafish (Danio rerio), they sense predators using their lateral line system. When larvae are positioned lateral to a predator, they will escape in a likewise lateral direction. According to game theory, zebrafish who are positioned lateral and ventral to the predator are more likely to survive, rather than any alternate strategy. Finally, the faster (cm/s) the predator is moving, the faster downward the fish will move to escape predation.

Recent research in guppies has shown that familiarity can affect the reaction time involved in the escape response. Guppies that were placed in familiar groups were more likely to respond than guppies who were assigned to unfamiliar groups. Wolcott et al. (2017) suggest that familiar groups may lead to reduced inspection and aggression among conspecifics. The theory of limited attention states that the brain has a limited amount of information processing, and, as an individual is engaged in more tasks, the less resources it can provide to one given task. As a result, they have more attention that they can devote toward anti-predator behaviour.

=== In insects ===
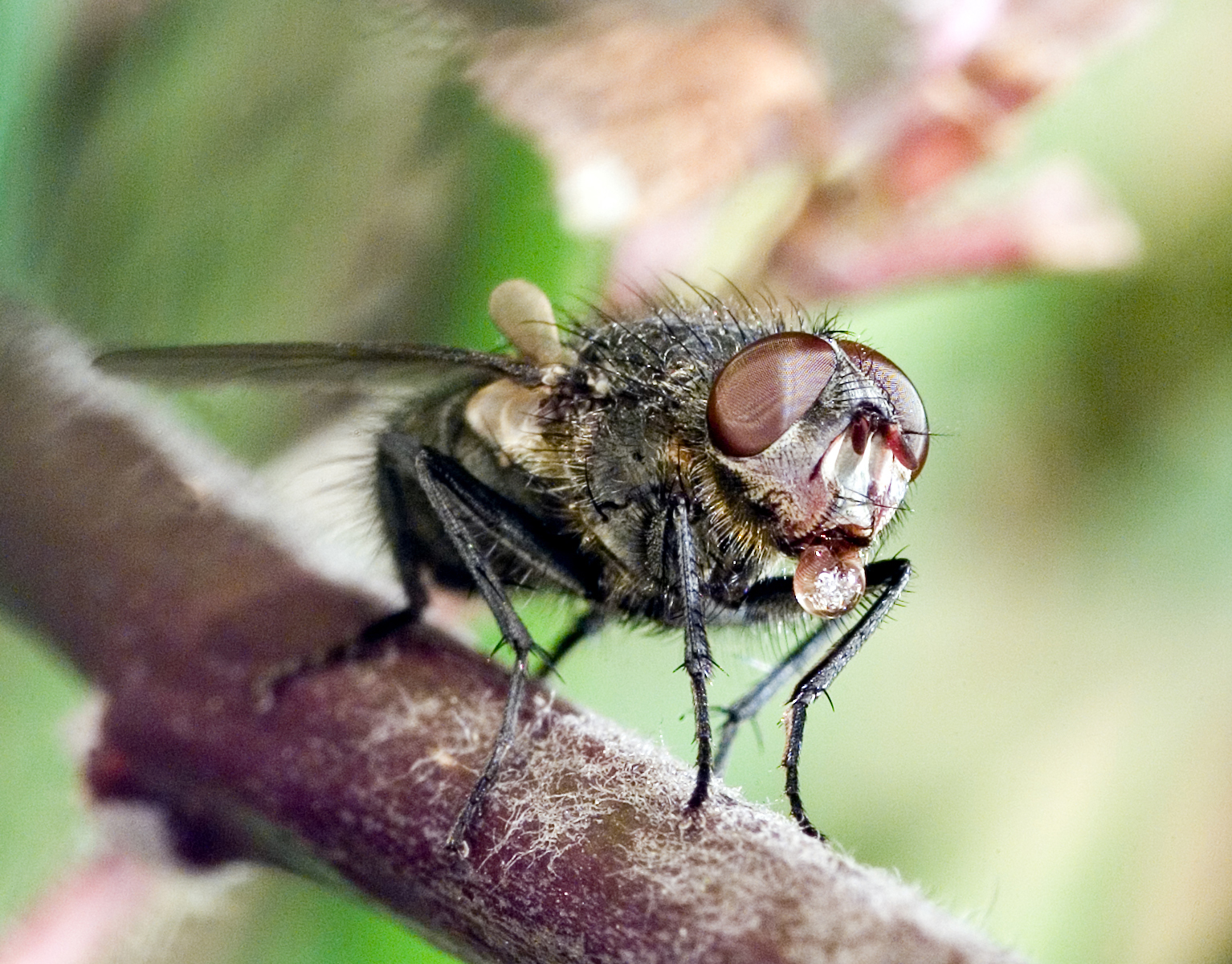
Recent research suggests that the escape response in Musca domestica may be controlled by the compound eyes.

When house flies (Musca domestica) encounter an aversive stimulus, they jump rapidly and fly away from the stimulus. Recent research suggests that the escape response in Musca domestica is controlled by a pair of compound eyes, rather than by the ocelli. When one of the compound eyes was covered, the minimum threshold to elicit an escape response increased. In short, the escape reaction of Musca domestica is evoked by the combination of both motion and light.

Cockroaches are also well known for their escape response. When individuals sense a wind puff, they will turn and escape in the opposite direction. The sensory neurons in the paired caudal cerci (singular: cercus) at the rear of the animal send a message along the ventral nerve cord. Then, one of two responses is elicited: running (through the ventral giant interneurons) or flying/running (through the dorsal giant interneurons). A study on dragonflies and damselflies (Odonata) found that while urbanization level did not directly affect their escape behavior, escape responses of Odonata were delayed in areas with high human activity.

=== In mammals ===
Mammals can display a wide range of escape responses. Some of the most common escape responses include withdrawal reflexes, fleeing, and, in some instances where outright escape is too difficult, freezing behaviors.

Higher-order mammals often display withdrawal reflexes. Exposure to danger, or a painful stimulus (in nociceptor-mediated loops), initiates a spinal reflex loop. Sensory receptors transmit the signal to the spine where it is rapidly integrated by interneurons and consequently an efferent signal is sent down motor neurons. The effect of the motor neurons is to contract the muscles necessary to pull the body, or body part away from the stimulus.

Some mammals, like squirrels and other rodents, have defensive neural networks present in the midbrain that allow for quick adaptation of their defense strategy. If these animals are caught in an area without refuge, they can quickly change their strategy from fleeing to freezing. Freezing behavior allows the animal to avoid detection by the predator.

In 2007, Theodore Stankowich and Richard G. Coss studied the flight initiation distance of Columbian black-tailed deer. According to the authors, the flight initiation distance is the distance between prey and predator when the prey attempts an escape response. They found that the angle, distance, and speed that the deer escaped was related to the distance between the deer and its predator, a human male in this experiment.

=== Other examples ===
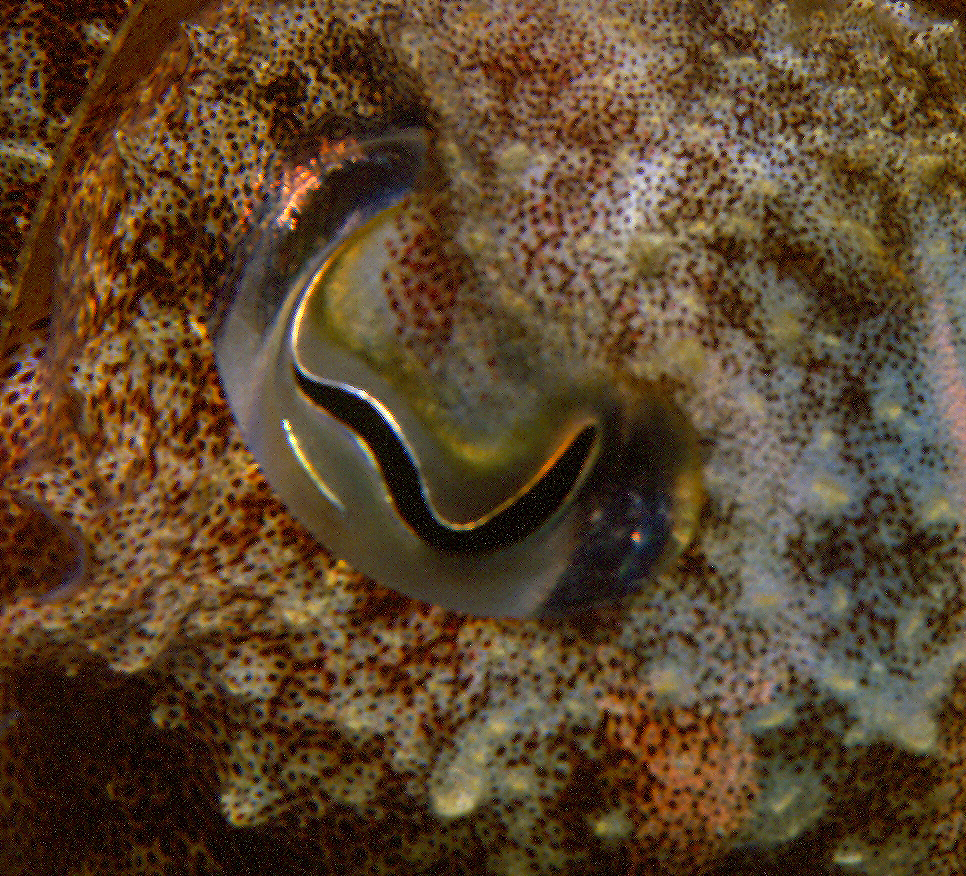
Cuttlefish (Sepia officinalis) avoid predation using a freezing behaviour. Some cuttlefish also use a jet-driven escape response.

Squids have developed a multitude of anti-predator escape responses, including: jet-driven escape, postural displays, inking and camouflage. Inking and jet-driven escape are arguably the most salient responses, in which the individual squirts ink at the predator as it speeds away. These blobs of ink can vary in size and shape; larger blobs can distract the predator while smaller blobs can provide a cover under which the squid can disappear. Finally, the released ink also contains hormones such as L-dopa and dopamine that can warn other conspecifics of danger while blocking olfactory receptors in the targeted predator.

Cuttlefish (Sepia officinalis) are also well known for their escape responses. Unlike squids, who may engage more salient escape responses, the cuttlefish has few defences so it relies on more conspicuous means: jet-driven escape and freezing behaviour. However, it appears that the majority of cuttlefish use a freezing escape response when avoiding predation. When the cuttlefish freeze, it minimizes the voltage of their bioelectric field, making them less susceptible to their predators, mainly sharks.

== See also ==
- Conditioned avoidance response test
