= List of reflexes =

Involuntary rapid nervous response in humans

A list of reflexes in humans.

- Abdominal reflex
- Accommodation reflex — coordinated changes in the vergence, lens shape and pupil size when looking at a distant object after a near object.
- Acoustic reflex or attenuation reflex — contraction of the stapedius and tensor tympani muscles in the middle ear in response to high sound intensities.
- Anal wink - contraction of the external anal sphincter upon stroking of the skin around the anus.
- Ankle jerk reflex — jerking of the ankle when the Achilles tendon is hit with a tendon hammer while the foot is relaxed, stimulating the S1 reflex arc.
- Arthrokinetic reflex — muscular activation or inhibition in response to joint mobilization
- Asymmetric tonic neck reflex (ATNR) or tonic neck reflex a primitive reflex— in infants up to four months of age, when the head is turned to the side, the arm on that side will straighten and the contralateral arm will bend.
- Babinski reflex — in infants up to one year of age, and also in older individuals with neurological damage, a spreading of the toes and extension of the big toe in response to stroking the side of the foot.
- Bainbridge reflex - increasing heart rate in response to increased central venous pressure.
- Baroreflex or baroreceptor reflex — homeostatic countereffect to a sudden elevation or reduction in blood pressure detected by the baroreceptors in the aortic arch, carotid sinuses, etc.
- Bezold-Jarisch reflex — involves a variety of cardiovascular and neurological processes which cause hypopnea and bradycardia.
- Belch reflex - a release of air from the esophagus, or stomach
- Biceps reflex — a jerking of the forearm when the biceps brachii tendon is struck with a tendon hammer, stimulating the C5 and C6 reflex arcs.
- Blushing — a reddening of the face caused by embarrassment, shame, or modesty.
- Brachioradialis reflex — a jerking of the forearm when the brachioradialis tendon is hit with a tendon hammer while the arm is resting, stimulating the C5 and C6 reflex arcs.
- Brain's reflex
- Bulbocavernosus reflex
- Cervico-collic reflex
- Cervico-ocular reflex — stabilizes the eyes in response to trunk-to-head movements
- Cervico-spinal reflex
- Churchill–Cope reflex
- Corneal reflex — blinking of both eyes when the cornea of either eye is touched.
- Coronary reflex
- Cough reflex — a rapid expulsion of air from the lungs after sudden opening of the glottis, and usually following irritation of the trachea.
- Cremasteric reflex — elevation of the scrotum and testis elicited by stroking of the superior and medial part of the thigh.
- Crossed extensor reflex — a contraction of a limb in response to ipsilateral pain, and extension of the contralateral limb.
- Cushing reflex - triad of hypertension, bradycardia, and irregular breathing in response to elevated ICP.
- Diving reflex
- Enterogastric reflex
- Galant reflex — a primitive reflex in infants up to four months of age, a rotation of the upper body towards one or other side of the back when that side is stroked.
- Glabellar reflex
- Golgi tendon reflex
- Hanger reflex - reflex of unclear purpose that causes the head to rotate to the right when the top sides of the head are under pressure, named because it can be easily activated with a coat hanger
- Hering–Breuer reflex — is a reflex triggered to prevent over-inflation of the lung
- Hoffmann's reflex — also known as the finger flexor reflex; middle finger and thumb response. Test can indicate both neurological damage and nerve regeneration; often combined with the Babinski reflex test.
- Jaw jerk reflex
- Knee jerk or patellar reflex — a kick caused by striking the patellar tendon with a tendon hammer just below the patella, stimulating the L4 and L3 reflex arcs.
- Moro reflex, a primitive reflex— only in all infants up to 4 or 5 months of age: a sudden symmetric spreading of the arms, then unspreading and crying, caused by an unexpected loud noise or the sensation of being dropped. It is the only unlearned fear in humans.
- Palmar grasp reflex — in infants up to six months of age, a closing of the hand in response to an object being placed in it.
- Periroral reflex: when a finger is placed at the angle of the mouth and struck, or the nasolabial fold is stroked, mouth closure is induced via CN VII
- Pharyngeal reflex — also known as the gag reflex.
- Photic sneeze reflex — a sneeze caused by sudden exposure to bright light.
- Plantar reflex — in infants up to 1 year of age, a curling of the toes when something rubs the ball of the foot.
- Pupillary accommodation reflex — a reduction of pupil size in response to an object coming close to the eye.
- Pupillary light reflex — a reduction of pupil size in response to light.
- Rectoanal inhibitory reflex - a transient relaxation of the internal anal sphincter in response to rectal distention.
- Rooting reflex — turning of an infant's head toward anything that strokes the cheek or mouth.
- Righting reflex - a proprioceptive reflex
- Shivering — shaking of the body in response to early hypothermia in warm-blooded animals.
- Sneeze or sternutation — a convulsive expulsion of air from the lungs normally triggered by irritation of the nasal mucosa in the nose.
- Startle-evoked movement — involuntary initiation of a planned movement in response to a startling stimulus.
- Startle reflex
- Sucking reflex — a primitive reflex, sucking at anything that touches the roof of an infant's mouth.
- Stretch reflex
- Triceps reflex — jerking of the forearm when the triceps tendon is hit with a tendon hammer, stimulating the C7 and C6 reflex arcs.
- Vagovagal reflex — contraction of muscles in the gastrointestinal tract in response to distension of the tract following consumption of food and drink.
- Vestibulocollic reflex
- Vestibulo-spinal reflex
- Vestibulo-ocular reflex — movement of the eyes to the right when the head is rotated to the left, and vice versa.
- Withdrawal reflex
- Yawn

== Bibliography ==
- Adelman G and Smith B H (Eds) (2004). Encyclopedia of Neuroscience, 3rd Edition. Elsevier Press : Oxford, UK.
