= Spinal interneuron =

Interneuron relaying signals between sensory and motor neurons in the spinal cord

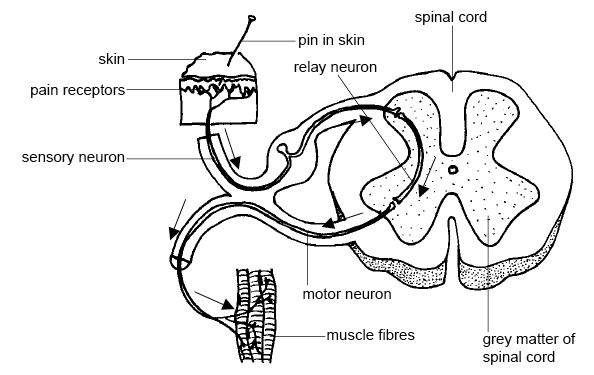
- Spinal interneuron integrates sensory-motor input

A spinal interneuron, found in the spinal cord, relays signals between (afferent) sensory neurons, and (efferent) motor neurons. Different classes of spinal interneurons are involved in the process of sensory-motor integration. Most interneurons are found in the grey column, a region of grey matter in the spinal cord.

== Structure ==
The grey column of the spinal cord appears to have groups of small neurons, often referred to as spinal interneurons, that are neither primary sensory cells nor motor neurons. The versatile properties of these spinal interneurons cover a wide range of activities. Their functions include the processing of sensory input, the modulation of motor neuron activity, the coordination of activity at different spinal levels, and the relay of sensory or proprioceptive data to the brain. There has been extensive research on the identification and characterization of the spinal cord interneurons based on factors such as location, size, structure, connectivity, and function. Generally, it is difficult to characterize every aspect of the neuronal anatomy of a vertebrate's spinal cord. This difficulty is due not only to its structural complexity but also to the morphology and the connectivity of neurons. For instance, in the spinal cord of a 19-day-old rat embryo, at least 17 different subclasses of interneurons with ipsilateral axon projections were found. In addition, 18 types of commissural interneurons have been identified on the basis of morphology and location.

=== Location ===
In particular, the cell bodies of the spinal interneurons are found in the grey matter of the spinal cord, which also contains the motor neurons. In 1952, the grey matter of the cat's spinal cord was investigated, and it was shown to have ten distinct zones referred to as Rexed laminae. Eventually, the lamination pattern was also observed in several species including humans. Rexed laminae VII and VIII are locations where most of the interneurons are found.

Rexed laminae

== Development ==
In the mouse's dorsal alar plate, six progenitor domains give rise to dI1-dI6 neurons and two classes of dorsal interneurons. In addition, in the ventral half of the neural tube, four classes of (CPG) interneurons known as V0, V1, V2, and V3 neurons are generated. V0 neurons are commissural neurons that extend their axons rostrally for 2-4 spinal cord regions in the embryonic spinal cord. V3 neurons are excitatory commissural interneurons that extend caudally projecting primary axons. The V1 neurons are inhibitory interneurons with axons that project ipsilaterally and rostrally. V2 neurons, which include a population of glutamatergic V2a neurons and inhibitory V2b neurons, project ipsilaterally and caudally across multiple spinal cord regions. The class V1 neurons give rise to two local circuit inhibitory neurons known as Renshaw cells and Ia inhibitory interneurons.

CPG interneurons	Type	Axon projection in embryonic cord
V0	Commissural	Rostrally
V1	Inhibitory (Renshaw cells and Ia interneurons)	Rostrally and ipsilaterally
V2	Glutamatergic V2a and Inhibitory V2b	Ipsilaterally and caudally
V3	Excitatory Commissural	Caudally

== Function ==
The integration of the sensory feedback signals and central motor commands at several levels of the central nervous system plays a critical role in controlling movement. Research on cat's spinal cord has shown that at the spinal cord level sensory afferents and descending motor pathways converge onto common spinal interneurons. Human studies since the 1970s have documented how this integration of motor commands and sensory feedback signals is used to control muscle activity during movement. During locomotion, the sum of convergent inputs from the central pattern generator (CPG), sensory feedback, descending commands and other intrinsic properties turned on by different neuromodulators give rise to the activity of the interneurons. Further, this interneuronal activity was either recorded directly or inferred from the modulation of response in their postsynaptic targets, most often motoneurons. The most efficient way to gate sensory signals in reflex pathways is to control the firing level of interneurons. For example, during locomotion, the interneuronal activity is modulated via excitation or inhibition depending on the reflex pathways. Thus, different patterns of interneuronal activity will determine which pathways are open, blocked, or modulated.

=== Neurotransmitter ===
The sensory information that is transmitted to the spinal cord is modulated by a complex network of excitatory and inhibitory interneurons. Different neurotransmitters are released from different interneurons, but the two most common neurotransmitters are GABA, the primary inhibitory neurotransmitter and glutamate, the primary excitatory neurotransmitter. Acetylcholine is a neurotransmitter that often activates interneurons by binding to a receptor on the membrane.

=== Renshaw cells ===
Renshaw cells are among the first identified interneurons. This type of interneuron projects onto α-motoneurons, where it establishes inhibition by expressing its inhibitory neurotransmitter glycine. However, some reports have indicated that Renshaw cells synthesize calcium-binding proteins calbindin-D28k and parvalbumin. Further, during spinal reflex, Renshaw cells control the activity of the spinal motoneurons. They are excited by the axon collaterals of the motor neurons. In addition, Renshaw cells make inhibitory connections to several groups of motor neurons, Ia inhibitory interneurons as well as the same motor neuron that excited them previously. Furthermore, the connection to the motor neurons establishes a negative feedback system that may regulate the firing rate of the motor neurons. Moreover, the connections to the Ia inhibitory interneurons may modulate the strength of the reciprocal inhibition to the antagonist motor neuron.

=== Ia inhibitory interneuron ===
Joints are controlled by two opposing sets of muscles called extensors and flexors that must work in synchrony to allow proper and desired movement. When a muscle spindle is stretched and the stretch reflex is activated, the opposing muscle group must be inhibited to prevent from working against the agonist muscle. The spinal interneuron called Ia inhibitory interneuron is responsible for this inhibition of the antagonist muscle. The Ia afferent of the muscle spindle enters the spinal cord, and one branch synapses on to the alpha motor neuron that causes the agonist muscle to contract. Thus, it results in creating the behavioral reflex.

At the same time, the other branch of the Ia afferent synapses on to the Ia inhibitory interneuron, which in turn synapses the alpha motor neuron of the antagonist muscle. Since Ia interneuron is inhibitory, it prevents the opposing alpha motor neuron from firing. Thus, it prevents the antagonist muscle from contracting. Without having this system of reciprocal inhibition, both groups of muscles may contract at the same time and work against each other. This results in spending a greater amount of energy as well.

In addition, the reciprocal inhibition is important for mechanism underlying voluntary movement. When the antagonist muscle relaxes during movement, this increases efficiency and speed. This prevents moving muscles from working against the contraction force of antagonist muscles. Thus, during voluntary movement, the Ia inhibitory interneurons are used to coordinate muscle contraction.

Further, the Ia inhibitory interneurons allow the higher centers to coordinate commands sent to the two muscles working opposite of each other at a single joint via a single command. The interneuron receives the input command from the corticospinal descending axons in such a way that the descending signal, which activates the contraction of one muscle, causes relaxation of the other muscles.

=== Ib inhibitory interneuron ===
The autogenic inhibition reflex is a spinal reflex phenomenon that involves the Golgi tendon organ. When tension is applied to a muscle, group Ib fibers that innervate the Golgi tendon organ are activated. These afferent fibers project onto the spinal cord and synapse with the spinal interneurons called Ib inhibitory interneurons. This spinal interneuron makes an inhibitory synapse onto the alpha motor neuron that innervates the same muscle that caused the Ib afferent to fire. As a result of this reflex, activation of the Ib afferent causes the alpha motor neuron to become inhibited. Thus, the contraction of the muscle stops. This is an example of a disynaptic reflex, in which the circuitry contains a spinal interneuron between the sensory afferent and the motor neuron.

The activities of the extensor and flexor muscles must be coordinated in the autogenic inhibition reflex. The Ib afferent branches in the spinal cord. One branch synapses the Ib inhibitory interneuron. The other branch synapses onto an excitatory interneuron. This excitatory interneuron innervates the alpha motor neuron that controls the antagonist muscle. When the agonist muscle is inhibited from contracting, the antagonist muscle contracts.

=== Excitatory interneurons mediating cutaneous inputs ===
An important reflex initiated by cutaneous receptors and pain receptors is the flexor reflex. This reflex mechanism allows for quick withdrawal of the body parts, in this case a limb, from the harmful stimulus. The signal travels to the spinal cord and a response is initiated even before it travels up to the brain centers for a conscious decision to be made. The reflex circuit involves the activation of the Group III afferents of pain receptors due to a stimulus affecting a limb, e.g. a foot. These afferents enter the spinal cord and travel up to the lumbar region, where they synapse an excitatory interneuron. This interneuron excites the alpha motor neuron that causes contraction of the thigh flexor muscle.

Also, Group III afferent travels up to L2 vertebra, where they branch onto another excitatory interneuron. This interneuron excites the alpha motor neurons, which then excite the hip flexor muscle. This synchronized communication allows for the removal of the whole leg from the painful stimulus. This is an example of the spinal cord circuitry coordinating movement at several joints simultaneously. In addition, during flexor reflex, when the knee joints and hip joints are flexed, the antagonist extensor muscles must be inhibited. This inhibitory effect is achieved when Group III afferents synapse inhibitory interneurons that in turn synapse the alpha motor neurons innervating the antagonists muscle.

The flexor reflex not only coordinates the activity of the leg being removed but also the activity of the other leg. When one leg is removed, the weight of the body needs to be distributed to the opposite leg to maintain the body's balance. Thus, the flexor reflex incorporates a crossed extension reflex. A branch of the Group III afferent synapse an excitatory interneuron, which extends its axon across the midline into the contralateral spinal cord. At that location, the interneuron excites the alpha motor neurons that innervate the extensor muscles of the opposite leg. This allows for balance and body posture to be maintained.

=== Excitatory commissural interneurons ===
A group of commissural interneurons present in lamina VIII in mid-lumbar segments mediates excitation of contralateral motoneurons by reticulospinal neurons. These neurons receive monosynaptic inputs from ipsilateral reticular formation and are not directly activated by group II afferents.

Another class of lamina VIII commissural neurons includes a group that is activated by both reticulospinal and vestibular systems. These cells can also be activated indirectly by group I and group II afferents. These cells have also been shown to be active during locomotion.
