= Cutaneous reflex in human locomotion =

Tripping Activates Cutaneous Reflex

Cutaneous, superficial, or skin reflexes, are activated by skin receptors and play a valuable role in locomotion, providing quick responses to unexpected environmental challenges. They have been shown to be important in responses to obstacles or stumbling, in preparing for visually challenging terrain, and for assistance in making adjustments when instability is introduced. In addition to the role in normal locomotion, cutaneous reflexes are being studied for their potential in enhancing rehabilitation therapy (physiotherapy) for people with gait abnormalities.

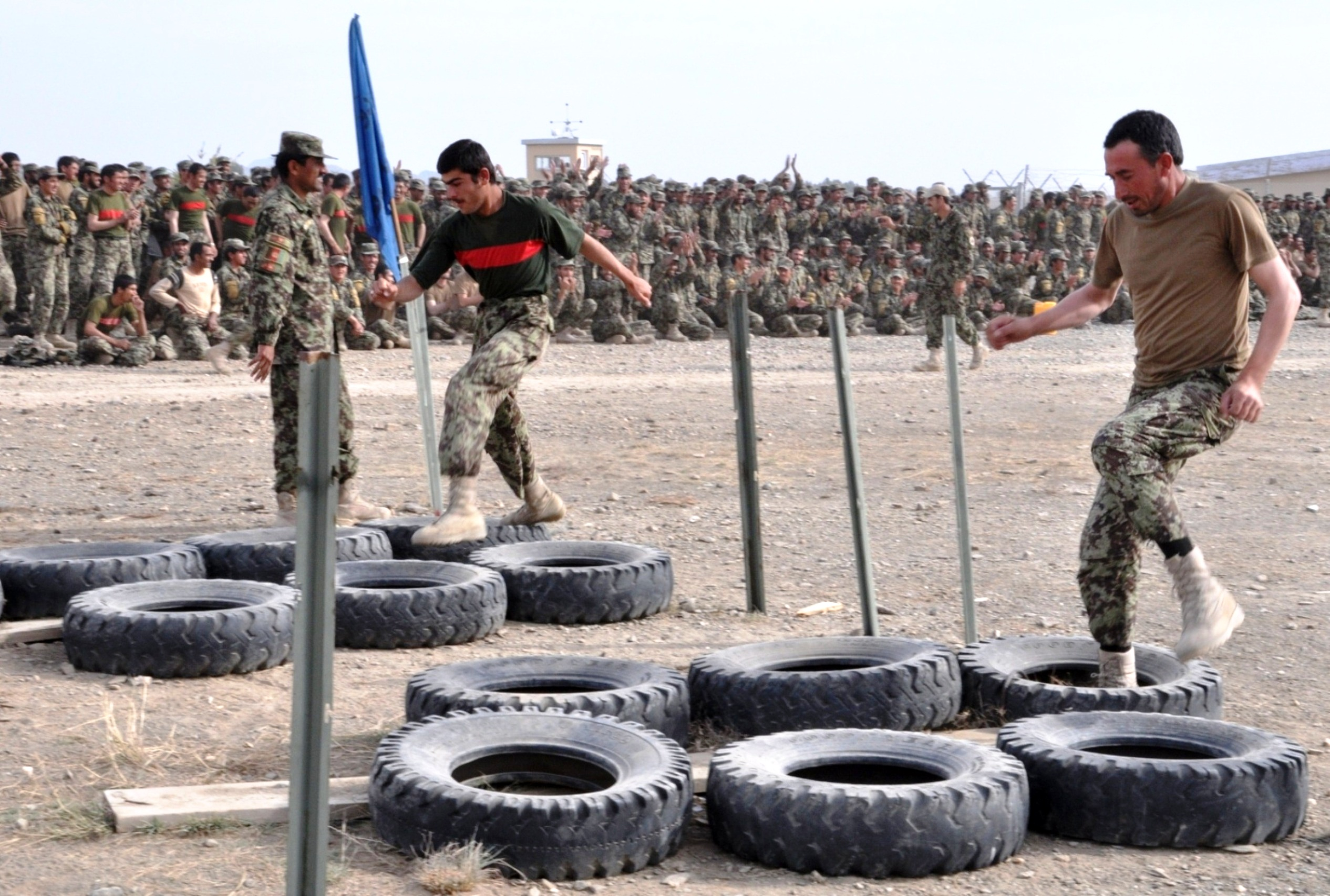
Quick responses to obstacles

== Background of reflex pathway ==
Reflexes are a vital part of the bodies everyday activities. Part of the human body is based on reactions and how fast and automatic these responses to environmental interactions can be. They can protect us from potentially dangerous situations such as touching a hot stove or stepping on a sharp object. There are also reflex pathways involved in more dynamic activities such as walking and running, helping to ensure a smooth gait and allowing bodies to respond quickly to obstacles or unexpected perturbations or disturbances.

Pathway of a Monosynaptic Reflex

The reflex pathway (reflex arc) is a sequence of neurons connecting the sensory input (afferent neuron) to the motor output (efferent neuron), resulting in a behavioral response. The general pathway of a spinal reflex is one which involves neurons contained within the spinal cord. However, the brain may also provide additional (supraspinal) contributions, which can modulate the responsiveness of the reflex to the sensory input.

=== General reflex pathways ===
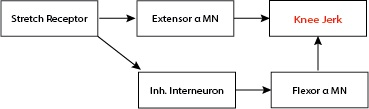

Reflexes can be very simple, as in the monosynaptic reflex, which only contains one synapse, or more complicated, as in the polysynaptic reflex, which involves more than one synapse. The knee jerk reflex is a common example of a monosynaptic reflex when one is looking at the quadriceps motor response of kicking your leg out. It can also be used as an example of a polysynaptic reflex when looking at the involvement of inhibitory interneurons to relax the hamstrings. The complexity of the reflex can be estimated by examining the time delay, or latency, between the electrical stimulation of the sensory neuron and the corresponding motor response, as measured by EMG (electromyography). Most reflexes can be categorized in one of three groups depending on the latency of EMG response. The short-latency reflex (SLR) is the fastest (~40-50 ms) and involves a mono-synaptic pathway. The medium-latency reflex (MLR) utilizes interneurons within the spinal cord and is typically ~80-90 ms. The long-latency reflex (LLR) is ~120-140 ms, suggesting that it is mediated by additional supraspinal input from the brain.

=== Cutaneous receptors and reflexes ===
Cutaneous receptors are a type of sensory receptor, which respond to stimuli (touch, pressure, pain, temperature) that provide information regarding contact with the external environment. A common reflex involving cutaneous receptors is the crossed extensor reflex. This reflex is recruited when we experience a painful stimulus on the bottom of our foot, such as stepping on a tack. The response is to quickly pull the foot that stepped on the tack away, and at the same time, shift our weight to the opposite (contralateral) leg for balance.

It has been noted that the muscle activation response to cutaneous receptor stimulation can be modulated by a variety of factors. These include the:

- cutaneous nerve stimulated
- phase of the gait cycle
- intensity of the stimulation
- nature of the task being performed
- rhythmic arm or leg movements
- complexity of the task.

In addition to modulation, the cutaneous reflex has been shown to evoke both a MLR (medium latency response) and LLR (long latency response) EMG response, indicating that it is a polysynaptic reflex, involving spinal interneurons or supraspinal pathways

== Functional role ==
Cutaneous nerves

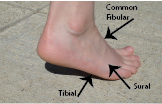
General surface location for activation of three cutaneous receptors

The cutaneous reflex has been attributed to functional responses to disturbances encountered during locomotion and is, therefore, dependent on which cutaneous nerve is stimulated. Examples of nerves whose cutaneous branches have been examined are the:

1. Superficial fibular nerve or peroneal nerve (innervating the dorsal aspect of the foot) 2. Tibial nerve (innervating the plantar surface of the foot)3. Sural nerve (innervating the lateral portion of the foot)4. Superficial branch of radial nerve (innervating forearm and hand on the thumb side)

Stance and swing phase of a gait cycle

Human locomotion is often examined from the perspective of the gait cycle. Cutaneous reflexes demonstrate variations in the muscles activated and the timing at which they are activated depending on which portion of the gait cycle the stimulation occurs. This variation suggests a functional role for the reflex to provide us with a smooth gait alteration when encountering or anticipating obstacles and challenging terrain. The major muscles impacted involve four (4) motions important to locomotion:

Thigh muscles responding to cutaneous reflex

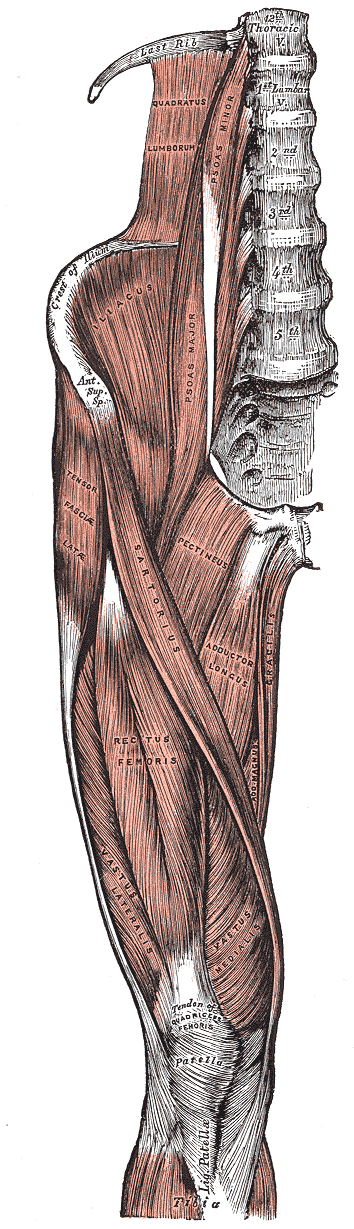
Vastus lateralis (knee extensor)

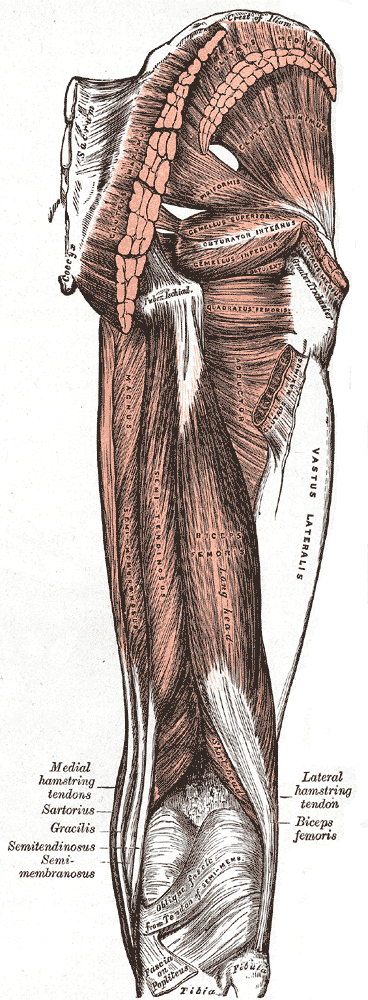
Biceps femoris (knee flexor)

Lower leg muscles responding to cutaneous reflex

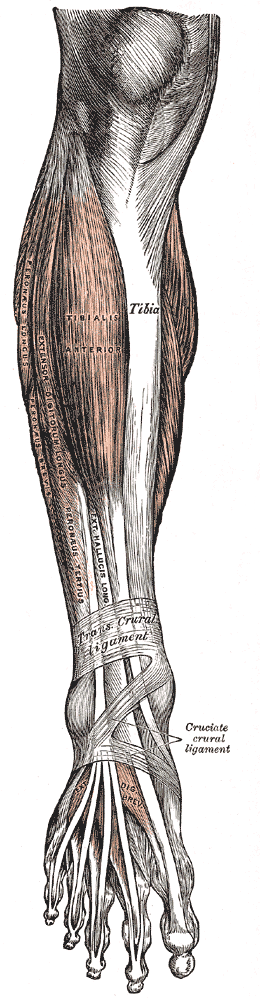
Tibialis anterior (dorsiflexor)

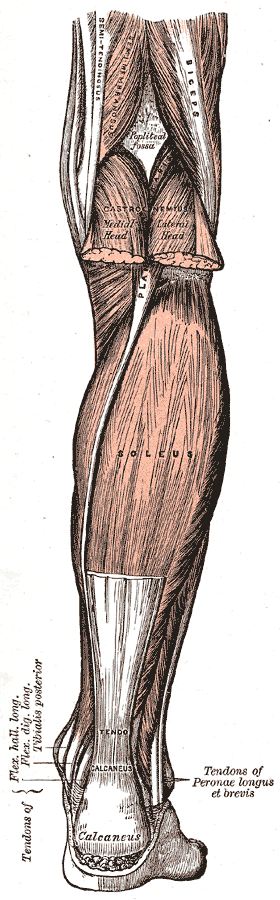
Gastrocnemius (plantar flexor)

Leg Motion	Muscle Group	Typical muscle measured for EMG activity
Knee flexion	Hamstrings	Biceps femoris
Knee extension	Quadriceps	Vastus lateralis
Ankle plantar flexion (pointing toes)	Calf muscles	Gastrocnemius or Soleus
Ankle dorsiflexion (raising toes up)	Shin muscle	Tibialis anterior

=== Superficial fibular nerve (SF) ===
Cutaneous stimulation of the superficial fibular nerve (SF) would typically occur when the top of the foot encounters an obstacle. The reflexive response to this activation is to pull the leg up and over the obstacle, while also preparing for a possible stumble or fall. Observed EMG muscle responses to SF stimulation help to explain how this reflexive response is accomplished:

- Increased biceps femoris activity flexes the knee, pulling the leg up and over the obstacle.
- Decreased tibialis anterior activity allows the gastrocnemius to more completely plantar flex, or point the toe. This allows the foot to slide over the obstacle.
- Increased vastus lateralis activity produces a co-contraction of the hamstrings and quadriceps, which provides increased knee stability in case of a stumble or fall.

=== Tibial nerve (TN) ===
Tibial nerve (TN) stimulation demonstrates a phase dependent response, in which the muscle activation varies depending on what part of the gait cycle a person is in when the stimulation occurs.

1. In normal, unimpeded walking, TN activation during the transition from stance to swing should decrease as the foot begins to leave the ground. In this case, increased TN stimulation would suggest scuffing of the bottom of the foot along the ground. The reflexive response will bring the foot up, pulling it off the ground. EMG responses to stimulation, again, help to explain how this is accomplished.

- Increased tibialis anterior activity produces dorsiflexion, raising the foot off the ground.

2. TN activation during late swing in normal walking should begin to increase as the foot begins to contact the ground. TN stimulation during this phase is, therefore, similar to a normal gait pattern sensory input. In this situation, the foot will plantar flex to allow smooth placement for the transition to the stance phase. Here, the opposite EMG effect is observed.

- Decreased tibialis anterior activity reduces active dorsiflexion, allowing the ankle to achieve greater plantar flexion.

=== Sural nerve (SN) ===
Sural nerve (SN) stimulation results in a reflex that is both phase and intensity dependent. The sural nerve innervates the lateral (outside) portion of the foot and could be activated during either the swing or stance phase when encountering uneven terrain. The intensity dependent response is indicative of the level of activation and, therefore, the potential for harm.

1. During the swing phase, SN stimulation indicates encountering an obstacle on the lateral side of the foot. The reaction is to move the foot inward and the leg up, out of the way. Observed EMG responses are:

- Increased tibialis anterior activity to cause dorsiflexion and inversion (turning the foot inward) of the foot.
- Increased biceps femoris activity will cause knee flexion to raise the foot higher and away from the obstacle.
- Decreased vastus lateralis activity will increase the ability for the biceps femoris to flex the knee to pull it up.

2. During the stance phase, a moderate intensity SN stimulation is indicative of uneven terrain and will result in a response that provides stiffness and stability to the ankle. The mechanism for this response is accomplished through the simultaneous activation of two antagonistic ankle muscles

- Increased gastrocnemius and tibialis anterior activity will provide stiffness to the ankle joint, helping to prevent the spraining of the ankle.

3. During the stance phase, a high intensity SN stimulation is indicative of an obstacle that could potentially cause physical damage to the foot. In this case, the goal of the reflex would be to remove the foot completely away from the stimulus.

- Decreased activity of the gastrocnemius will allow for a more complete dorsiflexion and inversion by the tibialis anterior pulling the foot both up and inward, preventing the foot from staying in contact with the potentially damaging surface.

=== Superficial radial nerve (SR) ===
Cutaneous stimulation of the superficial radial nerve (located on the thumb side of the forearm) will evoke a cutaneous reflex in arm muscles during rhythmic arm movements in a manner similar to that observed with leg muscles during locomotion. In addition to its role in reflex responses to the arm itself, it will modulate leg muscle cutaneous reflexes during locomotion. This reflexive response may be a vestigial remnant from our quadruped ancestry, connecting forelimb movement with hindlimb movement. This connection can be seen with normal walking, when the arm swings in rhythm with the opposite leg. The crossed synchrony may be partially due to a shared neural pathway between upper and lower limbs. While the function of this coordinated movement may be involved in maintaining balance while shifting our center of mass, it is also involved in locomotive reflexes. Stimulation of the radial nerve during walking is unusual and often indicative of an obstacle that is high enough to make contact with the swinging arm. Concurrent, or simultaneous stimulation of both the superficial fibular nerve (top of the foot) and the superficial radial nerve of the opposite (contralateral) arm suggests that the obstacle is large enough to cause a major stumble or fall. The response is, therefore, one which activates the leg muscles in a way as to prepare for that possibility. EMG responses to this type of simultaneous stimulation involves significant changes in the leg opposite or (contralateral) to the side receiving the radial simulation:

- Increased activity of the contralateral tibialis anterior and contralateral vastus lateralis to provide additional stiffness and stability to the leg.

== Additional variables modulating cutaneous reflex response ==
The magnitude of the cutaneous reflex in leg muscles can be altered by multiple variables. The alterations are movement dependent, gait phase dependent, and can be either excitatory or inhibitory to the normal cutaneous reflex pattern.

=== Complexity or challenge of the task ===
Cutaneous reflexes are modulated in conditions which present instability or challenging locomotive movements. In unstable conditions, such as disturbances occurring when the arms are crossed, there is facilitation or amplification in both the ipsilateral and contralateral reflexes which are muscle specific. With superficial fibular nerve stimulation, the ipsilateral biceps femoris (knee flexor) and ipsilateral soleus (plantar flexor) reflexes are amplified during swing to allow the leg to clear the obstacle. In contrast, the contralateral, opposite, leg demonstrates amplification of both the tibialis anterior (dorsiflexor) and the gastrocnemius (plantar flexor) providing additional leg stiffness for stability of the stance leg.

Similar amplification results are seen in both visually challenging environments, such as horizontal ladder stepping, and backward walking. These situations demonstrate facilitation of the contralateral reflexes during the stance phase to in a manner which would provide stability and ipsilateral reflex modulation in a way to allow smooth transition past the perceived obstacle.

== Potential clinical applications of cutaneous reflex modulation ==
The ability to modulate the magnitude of cutaneous reflexes via rhythmic arm movements or challenging environments has potential implications in rehabilitation for patients with motor weakness. Some stroke patients with lower limb complications demonstrate reduced or blunted cutaneous reflexes. These lower limb reflexes can be amplified with superficial radial nerve stimulation by taking advantage of the interlimb reflex observed during rhythmic arm locomotion between the upper and lower limbs. The amplification of the contralateral tibialis anterior seen during the swing to stance transition may be clinically useful in preventing foot drop during the swing phase for stroke patients. Future research is needed to further explore the efficacy of cutaneous reflex amplification for as a tool for enhancing motor receptivity with stroke rehabilitation.
