= Postural control =

Maintenance of body posture in space

Postural control refers to the maintenance of body posture in space. The central nervous system interprets sensory input to produce motor output that maintains upright posture. Sensory information used for postural control largely comes from visual, proprioceptive, and vestibular systems. While the ability to regulate posture in vertebrates was previously thought to be a mostly automatic task, controlled by circuits in the spinal cord and brainstem, it is now clear that cortical areas are also involved, updating motor commands based on the state of the body and environment.

== Definition ==
Postural control is defined as achievement, maintenance or regulation of balance during any static posture or dynamic activity for the regulation of stability and orientation. The interaction of the individual with the task and the environment develops postural control. Stability refers to maintenance of the center of mass within the base of support while orientation refers to maintenance of relationship within the body segments and between body and the environment for the task. These stability and orientation challenges necessitate change in the task and environment, thereby making postural control the most essential prerequisite for most of the tasks.

== Postural control strategies ==
There are two types of postural control strategies: predictive and reactive, which utilize the feed forward and feedback postural control respectively in order to maintain stability during various circumstances. Feed forward postural control refers to the postural adjustments made in response to the anticipation of a voluntary or a self-generated movement that may be destabilizing, while feedback postural control refer to the postural adjustments made in reaction to sensory stimuli from the externally generated perturbation. Furthermore, these strategies may involve either a fixed-support or a change-in-support response depending on the intensity of the perturbation.

== Systems involved in posture control ==
Postural control involves a complex interaction of multiple systems in order to maintain stability and orientation. Multi-components of the conceptual model of postural control include:

- Musculoskeletal components
- Neuro muscular synergies
- Individual sensory systems: visual, vestibular and somatosensory system
- Sensory strategies
- Anticipatory mechanisms
- Adaptive mechanisms
- Internal representations

The functional task and the environment define the precise organization of the postural systems.

== Postural control reflexes ==
Many animals have reflexes that aid in postural control. One of the most widespread feedback systems in limb postural control is the resistance reflex in arthropods and stretch reflex in vertebrates. These feedback loops consist of sensory neurons that detect external perturbations and activate motor neurons that produce movements that counter the imposed movement.

In some cases, a resistance reflex is reversed in certain contexts, becoming an ‘assistance reflex’ - causing movement in the same direction as the perturbation. For example, in the crayfish, perturbation of the leg causes a resistance reflex when the animal is standing, but an assistance reflex when the animal is walking. This phenomenon is called ‘reflex reversal’, where the reflex response to a stimulus changes given the state of the animal.

== Cortical control of posture ==
Traditionally postural control was regarded an automatic response to sensory stimuli generated by subcortical structures such as the brainstem and spinal circuits. Since postural responses are generated quickly, without voluntary intent and with less variability than cued, voluntary movements, cerebral cortex was not considered to be involved in postural control. However, current evolving evidence from numerous neurophysiological and neuroimaging studies (as given below) suggest cortical involvement in postural control and maintenance of balance.

=== Neurophysiological studies ===
An initial postural reaction on exposure to an external perturbations was shown to be generated by the brainstem and spinal cord in animal and human studies (short latency mono or polysynaptic spinal loop 40-65ms) followed by the later part of the reaction which is modified by direct transcortical loops (long latency loops, ~132 ms). Cerebral cortex via cerebellum which helps in adapting by using prior experience or via basal ganglia which helps generating a response based on the current context, modifies the postural response.

=== Neuroimaging studies ===
Various functional neuroimaging techniques such as Functional near-infrared spectroscopy, Functional magnetic resonance imaging, and Positron emission tomography have been used to elucidate cortical control in static and dynamic postures. Using PET, Ouchi Y et al. 1999 evaluated mechanisms involved in bipedal standing and confirmed the pivotal contribution of cerebellar vermis in maintenance of standing posture and further suggested involvement of the visual association cortex in controlling postural equilibrium while standing. Mauloin et al. 2003 using PET studied motor imagery of locomotion under four conditions and confirmed supraspinal control in locomotion by demonstrating activation in the dorsal premotor cortex and precuneus bilaterally, the left dorsolateral prefrontal cortex, the left inferior parietal lobule, and the right posterior cingulate cortex. There was increased engagement of higher cortical structures noted with increase in demands of locomotor tasks. Using FMRI, Jahn et al. 2004 studied the activation pattern with three imagined conditions and found that standing was associated with activation of the thalamus, basal ganglia, and cerebellar vermis. Using FNIRS, Mihara M et al. 2008 studied activation related to external perturbation and suggested prefrontal cortex to be involved in adequate allocation of visuospatial attention. Zwergal A et al. 2012 studied role of aging on activation pattern in standing and found more activation in bilateral insula, superior and middle temporal gyrus, inferior frontal gyrus, middle occipital gyrus and postcentral gyrus suggesting decreased reciprocal inhibition of these areas.
