= Superficial reflexes =

Superficial reflexes may refer to the:

- Abdominal reflex
- Cremasteric reflex
- Cutaneous reflex
