= Stretch reflex =

Muscle contraction in response to stretching

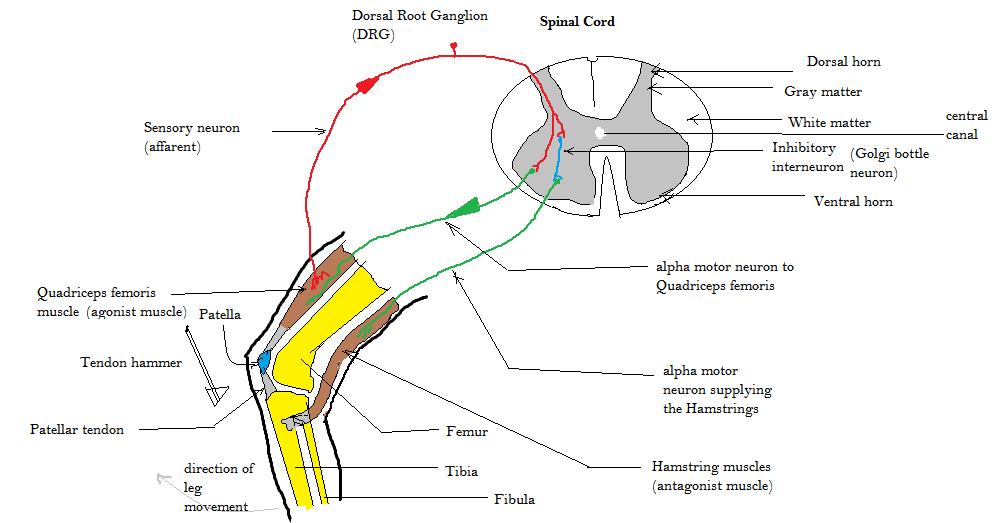
The patellar reflex is an example of the stretch reflex.

The stretch reflex (myotatic reflex), or more accurately muscle stretch reflex, is a muscle contraction in response to stretching a muscle. The function of the reflex is generally thought to be maintaining the muscle at a constant length but the response is often coordinated across multiple muscles and even joints. The older term deep tendon reflex is now criticized as misleading. Tendons have little to do with the response, and some muscles with stretch reflexes have no tendons. Rather, muscle spindles detect a stretch and convey the information to the central nervous system.

As an example of a spinal reflex, it results in a fast response that involves an afferent signal into the spinal cord and an efferent signal out to the muscle. The stretch reflex can be a monosynaptic reflex which provides automatic regulation of skeletal muscle length, whereby the signal entering the spinal cord arises from a change in muscle length or velocity. It can also include a polysynaptic component, as in the tonic stretch reflex.

When a muscle lengthens, the muscle spindle is stretched and its nerve activity increases. This increases alpha motor neuron activity, causing the muscle fibers to contract and thus resist the stretching. A secondary set of neurons also causes the opposing muscle to relax.

Gamma motoneurons regulate how sensitive the stretch reflex is by tightening or relaxing the fibers within the spindle. There are several theories as to what may trigger gamma motoneurons to increase the reflex's sensitivity. For example, alpha-gamma co-activation might keep the spindles taut when a muscle is contracted, preserving stretch reflex sensitivity even as the muscle fibers become shorter. Otherwise the spindles would become slack and the reflex would cease to function.

This reflex has the shortest latency of all spinal reflexes including the Golgi tendon reflex and reflexes mediated by pain and cutaneous receptors.

== Structures ==
The stretch reflex is accomplished through several different structures. In the muscle, there are muscle spindles, whose intrafusal muscle fibers lie parallel to the muscle and sense changes in length and velocity. The afferent sensory neuron is the structure that carries the signal from the muscle to the spinal cord. It carries this action potential to the dorsal root ganglion of the spinal cord. The efferent motor neuron is the structure that carries the signal from the spinal cord back to the muscle. It carries the action potential from the ventral root of the spinal cord to the muscle down the alpha motor neuron. This synapses on the first structure discussed, the extrafusal fibers of the muscle spindle.

== Examples ==
A person standing upright begins to lean to one side. The postural muscles that are closely connected to the vertebral column on the opposite side will stretch. The muscle spindles in those muscles will detect this stretching, and the stretched muscles will contract to correct posture.

Other examples (followed by involved spinal nerves) are responses to stretch created by a blow upon a muscle tendon:

- Jaw jerk reflex (CN V)
- Biceps reflex C5/C6
- Brachioradialis reflex C6
- Extensor digitorum reflex C6/C7
- Triceps reflex C7/C8
- Patellar reflex L2-L4 (knee-jerk)
- Ankle jerk reflex S1/S2

Another example is the group of sensory fibers in the calf muscle, which synapse with motor neurons innervating muscle fibers in the same muscle. A sudden stretch, such as tapping the Achilles' tendon, causes a reflex contraction in the muscle as the spindles sense the stretch and send an action potential to the motor neurons which then cause the muscle to contract; this particular reflex causes a contraction in the soleus-gastrocnemius group of muscles. Like the patellar reflex, this reflex can be enhanced by the Jendrassik maneuver.

== Spinal control ==
Spinal control of the stretch reflex means the signal travels between the muscle and spinal cord. The signal returns to the muscle from the same spinal cord segment as where it entered the spinal cord. This is the shortest distance for a reflex signal to travel, thus creating a fast response. These responses are often referred to as short latency stretch reflexes.

== Supraspinal control ==
Supraspinal control of the stretch reflex means the signal travels above the spinal cord before traveling back down to the same segment it entered the spinal cord from. The responses from these pathways are often termed medium or long latency stretch reflexes, because the time course is longer due to distance it needs to travel. The central nervous system can influence the stretch reflex via the gamma motoneurons, which as described above control the sensitivity of the reflex.

== Clinical significance ==
The patellar reflex (knee jerk) is an example of the stretch reflex and it is used to determine the sensitivity of the stretch reflex. Reflexes can be tested as part of a neurological examination, often if there is an injury to the central nervous system. To test the reflex, the muscle should be in a neutral position. The muscle being tested needs to be flexed for the clinician to locate the tendon. After the muscle is relaxed, the clinician strikes the tendon. The response should be contraction of the muscle. If this is the knee jerk reflex, the clinician should observe a kick. The clinician rates the response.

Grading of stretch reflexes upon tapping muscle tendon
| Grade | Response | Significance |
|---|---|---|
| 0 | no response | always abnormal |
| 1+ | slight but definitely present response | may or may not be normal |
| 2+ | brisk physiologic response | normal |
| 3+ | very brisk response | may or may not be normal |
| 4+ | clonus | always abnormal |

The clasp-knife response is a stretch reflex with a rapid decrease in resistance when attempting to flex a joint. It is one of the characteristic responses of an upper motor neuron lesion.

== See also ==
- Proprioception
- Reflex
