= Reciprocal inhibition =

Operation of opposing sets of muscles

Reciprocal inhibition is a neuromuscular process in which muscles on one side of a joint relax to allow the contraction of muscles on the opposite side, enabling smooth and coordinated movement. This concept, introduced by Charles Sherrington, a pioneering neuroscientist, is also referred to as reflexive antagonism in some allied health fields. Sherrington, one of the founding figures in neurophysiology, observed that when the central nervous system signals an agonist muscle to contract, inhibitory signals are sent to the antagonist muscle, encouraging it to relax and reduce resistance. This mechanism, known as reciprocal inhibition, is essential for efficient movement and helps prevent muscle strain by balancing forces around a joint.

== Mechanics ==
Joints are controlled by two opposing sets of muscles called extensors and flexors, that work in synchrony for smooth movement. When a muscle spindle is stretched, the stretch reflex is activated, and the opposing muscle group must be inhibited to prevent it from working against the contraction of the homonymous muscle. This inhibition is accomplished by the actions of an inhibitor interneuron in the spinal cord.

The afferent of the muscle spindle bifurcates in the spinal cord. One branch innervates the alpha motor neuron that causes the homonymous muscle to contract, producing the reflex. The other branch innervates the inhibitory interneuron, which then innervates the alpha motor neuron that synapses onto the opposing muscle. Because the interneuron is inhibitory, it prevents the opposing alpha motor neuron from firing, thereby reducing the contraction of the opposing muscle. Without this reciprocal inhibition, both groups of muscles might contract simultaneously and work against each other.

If opposing muscles were to contract at the same time, a muscle tear can occur. This may occur during physical activities such as running, during which opposing muscles engage and disengage sequentially to produce coordinated movement. Reciprocal inhibition facilitates ease of movement and is a safeguard against injury. However, if a "misfiring" of motor neurons occurs, causing simultaneous contraction of opposing muscles, a tear can occur. For example, if the quadriceps femoris and hamstring contract simultaneously at a high intensity, the stronger muscle (traditionally the quadriceps) overpowers the weaker muscle group (hamstrings). This can result in a common muscular injury known as a pulled hamstring, more accurately called a muscle strain.

== Duration ==
The phenomenon is fleeting, incomplete, and weak. For example, when the triceps brachii is stimulated, the biceps is reflexively inhibited. The incompleteness of the effect is related to postural and functional tone. Also, some reflexes in vivo are polysynaptic, with entire muscle groups responding to noxious stimuli.

As the body ages, the control of voluntary inhibition decreases in conjunction with the torque of the synapse as joints stiffen and their motor output is reduced. However, this reduction in ability tends to be insignificant.

== Application in physical therapy ==
Reciprocal inhibition is the basic original notion behind indirect muscle energy techniques. While this notion is now understood to be incomplete, the clinical mechanism of reflexive antagonism continues to be useful in physical therapy.

Muscle energy techniques that use reflexive antagonism, such as rapid deafferentation techniques, are medical guideline techniques and protocols that make use of reflexive pathways and reciprocal inhibition as a means of switching off inflammation, pain, and protective spasm for entire synergistic muscle groups or singular muscles and soft tissue structures.

== Bibliography ==
- Crone, C (1993). "Reciprocal inhibition in man". Dan Med Bull. 40 (5): 571–81. PMID 8299401.
- Neuroscience Online, Chapter 2: Spinal Reflexes and Descending Motor Pathways. James Knierim, Ph.D., Department of Neuroscience, The Johns Hopkins University http://nba.uth.tmc.edu/neuroscience/s3/chapter02.html
