= Fencing response =

Involuntary reflexive response due to brain injury

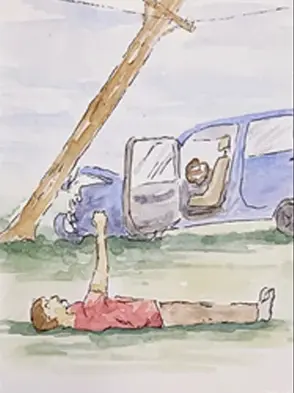
Artistic illustration of a fencing response

The fencing response is an unnatural position of the arms following a concussion. Immediately after moderate forces have been applied to the brainstem, the forearms are held flexed or extended (typically into the air) for a period lasting up to several seconds after the impact. The fencing response is often observed during athletic competition involving contact, such as combat sports, American football, ice hockey, rugby union, rugby league and Australian rules football. It is used as an overt indicator of injury force magnitude and midbrain localization to aid in injury identification and classification for events including on-field and/or bystander observations of sports-related head injuries.

== Relationship to fencing reflex and posturing ==
The fencing response is similar to the asymmetrical tonic neck reflex in infants. Like the reflex, a positive fencing response resembles the en garde position that initiates a fencing bout, with the extension of one arm and the flexion of the other.

Tonic posturing preceding convulsion has been observed in sports injuries at the moment of impact where extension and flexion of opposite arms occur despite body position or gravity. The fencing response emerges from the separation of tonic posturing from convulsion and refines the tonic posturing phase as an immediate forearm motor response to indicate injury force magnitude and location.

== Pathophysiology ==
The neuromotor manifestation of the fencing response resembles reflexes initiated by vestibular stimuli. Vestibular stimuli activate primitive reflexes in human infants, such as the asymmetric tonic neck reflex, Moro reflex, and parachute reflex, which are likely mediated by vestibular nuclei in the brainstem. The lateral vestibular nucleus (LVN; Deiter's nucleus) has descending efferent fibers in the vestibulocochlear nerve distributed to the motor nuclei of the anterior column and exerts an excitatory influence on ipsilateral limb extensor motor neurons while suppressing flexor motor neurons. The anatomical location of the LVN, adjacent to the cerebellar peduncles (see cerebellum), suggests that mechanical forces to the head may stretch the cerebellar peduncles and activate the LVN. LVN activity would manifest as limb extensor activation and flexor inhibition, defined as a fencing response, while flexion of the contralateral limb is likely mediated by crossed inhibition necessary for pattern generation.

In simpler terms, the shock of the trauma manually activates the nerves that control the muscle groups responsible for raising the arm. These muscle groups are activated by stimuli in infants for instincts such as grabbing for their mothers or breaking their falls. The LVN has neurons that connect it to motor neurons inside grey matter in the spinal cord, and sends signals to one side of the body that activate motor neurons that cause extension, while suppressing motor neurons that cause flexing. The LVN is located near the connection between the brain and the brain stem, which suggests that excessive force to the head may stretch this connection and thus activate the LVN. The neurons that are stimulated suppress neighboring neurons, which prevents neurons on the other side of the body from being stimulated.

== Injury severity and sports applications ==
In a survey of documented head injuries followed by unconsciousness, most of which involved sporting activities, two thirds of head impacts demonstrated a fencing response, indicating a high incidence of fencing in head injuries leading to unconsciousness, and those pertaining to athletic behavior. Likewise, animal models of diffuse brain injury have illustrated a fencing response upon injury at moderate but not mild levels of severity as well as a correlation between fencing, blood–brain barrier disruption, and nuclear shrinkage within the LVN, all of which indicate diagnostic utility of the response.

The most challenging aspect to managing sport-related concussion (mild traumatic brain injury, TBI) is recognizing the injury. Consensus conferences have worked toward objective criteria to identify mild TBI in the context of severe TBI. However, few tools are available for distinguishing mild TBI from moderate TBI. As a result, greater emphasis has regularly been placed on the management of concussions in athletes than on the immediate identification and treatment of such an injury.

On-field predictors of injury severity can define return-to-play guidelines and urgency of care, but past criteria have either lacked sufficient incidence for effective utility, did not directly address the severity of the injury, or have become cumbersome and fraught with inter-rater reliability issues.

== Fencing or posturing displays in a televised game ==
- Stevan Ridley playing in the NFL for the New England Patriots against Baltimore Ravens clashed with Bernard Pollard. Ridley was knocked unconscious, with medical professionals declaring it fencing response. He went on to have a full recovery, a long career, and became a Super Bowl champion (XLIX). He has not reported any signs of permanent brain damage since.
- Kenny Shaw, NCAA football wide receiver for Florida State, September 17, 2011.
- Jakub Voráček, Czech professional ice hockey winger for the Philadelphia Flyers after a hit by Niklas Kronwall, March 6, 2012.
- Xiong Fei, professional footballer, after being kicked in the head by Shanghai Shenhua FC teammate Li Jianbin, October 17, 2015.
- Tom Savage, professional American football quarterback for the Houston Texans, December 10, 2017.
- Donald Parham, professional American football tight end for the Los Angeles Chargers, December 16, 2021.
- Tua Tagovailoa, professional American football quarterback for the Miami Dolphins, September 29, 2022 and again on September 12, 2024.
- Barnabás Varga, Hungarian professional footballer, after a collision with Scotland goalkeeper Angus Gunn in the Euro 2024 Group A match on June 23, 2024.
- Daniel Sams, Australian cricketer, after a collision with Cameron Bancroft, both trying to go for a catch in the outfield, in their Sydney Thunder game in the BBL against the Perth Scorchers on January 3, 2025.
- CeeDee Lamb, professional American football wide receiver for the Dallas Cowboys, December 5, 2025.
- Dante Moore, American college football quarterback for the Oregon Ducks, September 26, 2026.
