= Arthrokinetic reflex =

The terms "arthrokinetic reflex" was coined by medical researchers at the University of Pittsburgh's Medical School, department of Physiology, in 1956 to refer to the way in which joint movement can reflexively cause muscle activation or inhibition.

The prefix "Arthro-" means joint, "kinetic" signifies motion, and a reflex in humans refers to an involuntary movement in response to a given stimulus. Thus, the arthrokinetic reflex refers to the involuntary response that happens when a joint is moved, namely that relevant muscles fire reflexively.

In 1956, Leonard Cohen and Manfred Cohen discovered that moving a decerebrate cat's knee joint resulted in muscle activation of the quadriceps or semitendinosus, depending on whether the knee joint was moved into flexion or extension. The results were published in the American Journal of Physiology (volume 184). The arthrokinetic reflex was later documented in other joints and muscle groups such as the Temporomandibular joint and mandibular musculature.

In recent years, practitioners of physical therapy and rehabilitation have suggested that the existence of the arthrokinetic reflex implies that joint mobilization may be useful in addressing chronic pain conditions such as lower-back pain or as a way to improve sports-related performance. Recent research has also hypothesized arthrokinetic reflex activity as the mechanism by which hip joint mobilization can positively aid training of hip abductor torque, whereby Type I and II articular mechanoreceptors inhibit or facilitate muscle tone.
