= Withdrawal reflex =

Spinal reflex

The withdrawal reflex (nociceptive flexion reflex or flexor withdrawal reflex) is a spinal reflex intended to protect the body from damaging stimuli. The reflex rapidly coordinates the contractions of all the flexor muscles and the relaxations of the extensors in that limb causing sudden withdrawal from the potentially damaging stimulus. Spinal reflexes are often monosynaptic and are mediated by a simple reflex arc. A withdrawal reflex is mediated by a polysynaptic reflex resulting in the stimulation of many motor neurons in order to give a quick response.

== Example ==
When a person touches a hot object and withdraws their hand from it without actively thinking about it, the heat stimulates temperature and pain receptors in the skin, triggering a sensory impulse that travels to the central nervous system. The sensory neuron then synapses with interneurons that connect to motor neurons. Some of these send motor impulses to the flexors that lead to the muscles in the arm to contract, while some motor neurons send inhibitory impulses to the extensors so flexion is not inhibited. This is referred to as reciprocal innervation.

The withdrawal reflex in the leg can be examined and measured, using an electromyogram to monitor the muscle activity in the upper leg (biceps femoris) while applying increasing electrical stimulation to the lower leg (sural nerve) on the same side of the body. The stimulus intensity at which the reflex is evoked is often the intensity at which the subject reports the onset of pain, and the strength of the withdrawal reflex is correlated with the strength of the pain experienced.

== Crossed extension reflex following withdrawal reflex ==
Once a danger receptor (called "nociceptor") has been stimulated, the signal travels via the sensory nerve to the dorsal (posterior) horn of the spinal cord. The nerve synapses with ipsilateral motor neurons that exit the ventral (anterior) horn of the spinal cord and work to pull the soon-to-be injured body part away from danger within 0.5 seconds. At the same time, the sensory neuron synapses with the ipsilateral motor neuron, as well as the motor neuron in the contralateral anterior horn. This motor neuron stabilizes the uninjured side of the body (for instance; preparing the other leg to support the entire body weight when the other foot has stepped on a tack). At the same time as these two synapses, the sensory neuron also sends signals along the spinal cord to get motor neurons to contract muscles that shift the center of gravity of the body to maintain balance. This contralateral stimulation of motor neurons to stabilize the body is called the crossed extension reflex, and is a result of the withdrawal reflex (usually in the lower extremities).

== See also ==
- Interneuron
- Nociceptor
- Reflex
