= Johann Susmann Galant =

Swiss physician and psychiatrist of Russian descent

- Born: 1896
- Died: 1978 (aged 81–82)
- Education: University of Basel
- Known for: Galant reflex
- Scientific career
- Fields: Medicine, Psychiatry

Johann Susmann Galant (1896–1978) was a Swiss physician and psychiatrist of Russian descent, known for his work in neurology and child development.

== Biography ==
Galant graduated from the University of Basel in 1917 with a degree in medicine. He became known particularly for his studies in neurology and for identifying the reflex that bears his name—the Galant reflex. This primitive reflex involves an involuntary movement in infants when the side of the spine is stimulated.

== Works ==
In 1924, Galant published an article titled Ungewöhnliche Störungen der Persönlichkeit (Das Phänomen der illusionierten Persönlichkeit) in the Journal für Psychologie und Neurologie.

In 1928, he also published a book titled Die eingebildete Schwangerschaft: Psychopathologisch und klinisch dargestellt, which deals with pseudocyesis (false pregnancy) from a clinical and psychopathological perspective.
