= Reflex =

Automatic, involuntary response to a stimulus

In biology, a reflex, or reflex action, is an involuntary, unplanned sequence or action and nearly instantaneous response to a stimulus.

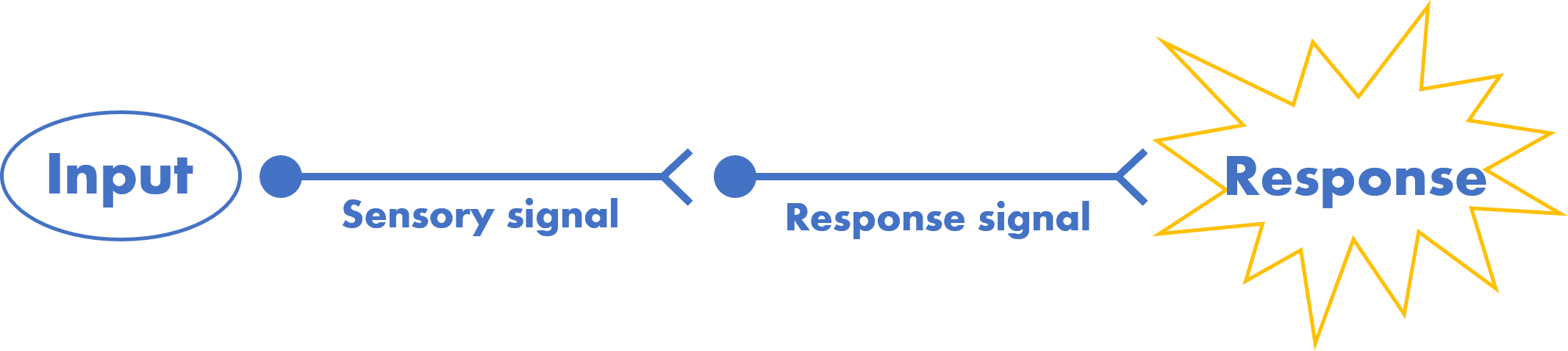
The simplest reflex is initiated by a stimulus, which activates an afferent nerve. The signal is then passed to a response neuron, which generates a response.

Reflexes are found with varying levels of complexity in organisms with a nervous system. A reflex occurs via neural pathways in the nervous system called reflex arcs. A stimulus initiates a neural signal, which is carried to a synapse. The signal is then transferred across the synapse to a motor neuron, which evokes a target response. These neural signals do not always travel to the brain, so many reflexes are an automatic response to a stimulus that does not receive or need conscious thought.

Many reflexes are fine-tuned to increase organism survival and self-defense. This is observed in reflexes such as the startle reflex, which provides an automatic response to an unexpected stimulus, and the feline righting reflex, which reorients a cat's body when falling to ensure safe landing. The simplest type of reflex, a short-latency reflex, has a single synapse, or junction, in the signaling pathway. Long-latency reflexes produce nerve signals that are transduced across multiple synapses before generating the reflex response.

== Types of human reflexes ==
=== Myotatic reflex ===
The myotatic or muscle stretch reflexes (sometimes known as deep tendon reflexes) provide information on the integrity of the central nervous system and peripheral nervous system. This information can be detected using electromyography (EMG). Generally, decreased reflexes indicate a peripheral problem, and lively or exaggerated reflexes a central one. A stretch reflex is the contraction of a muscle in response to its lengthwise stretch.

- Biceps reflex (C5, C6)
- Brachioradialis reflex (C5, C6, C7)
- Extensor digitorum reflex (C6, C7)
- Triceps reflex (C6, C7, C8)
- Patellar reflex or knee-jerk reflex (L2, L3, L4)
- Ankle jerk reflex (Achilles reflex) (S1, S2)

While the reflexes above are stimulated mechanically, the term H-reflex refers to the analogous reflex stimulated electrically, and tonic vibration reflex for those stimulated to vibration.

=== Tendon reflex ===
A tendon reflex is the contraction of a muscle in response to striking its tendon. The Golgi tendon reflex is the inverse of a stretch reflex.

=== Reflexes involving cranial nerves ===
Name	Sensory	Motor
Pupillary light reflex	II	III
Accommodation reflex	II	III
Jaw jerk reflex	V	V
Corneal reflex, also known as the blink reflex	V	VII
Glabellar reflex	V	VII
Vestibulo-ocular reflex	VIII	III, IV, VI +
Gag reflex	IX	X

=== Reflexes usually only observed in human infants ===
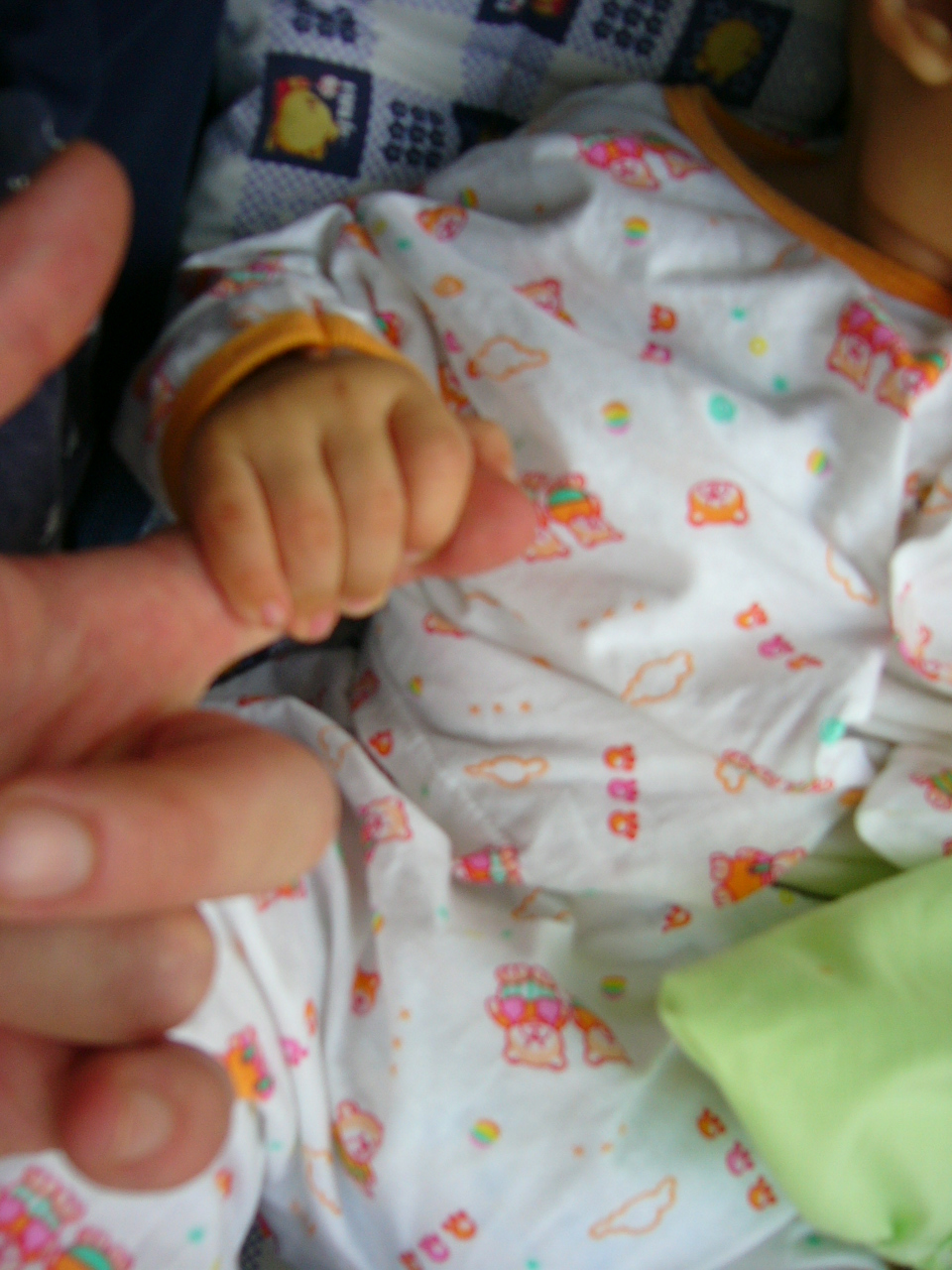
Grasp reflex

Newborn babies have a number of other reflexes which are not seen in adults, referred to as primitive reflexes. These automatic reactions to stimuli enable infants to respond to the environment before any learning has taken place. They include:

- Asymmetrical tonic neck reflex
- Palmomental reflex
- Moro reflex, also known as the startle reflex
- Palmar grasp reflex
- Rooting reflex
- Sucking reflex
- Symmetrical tonic neck reflex
- Tonic labyrinthine reflex

=== Other kinds of reflexes ===
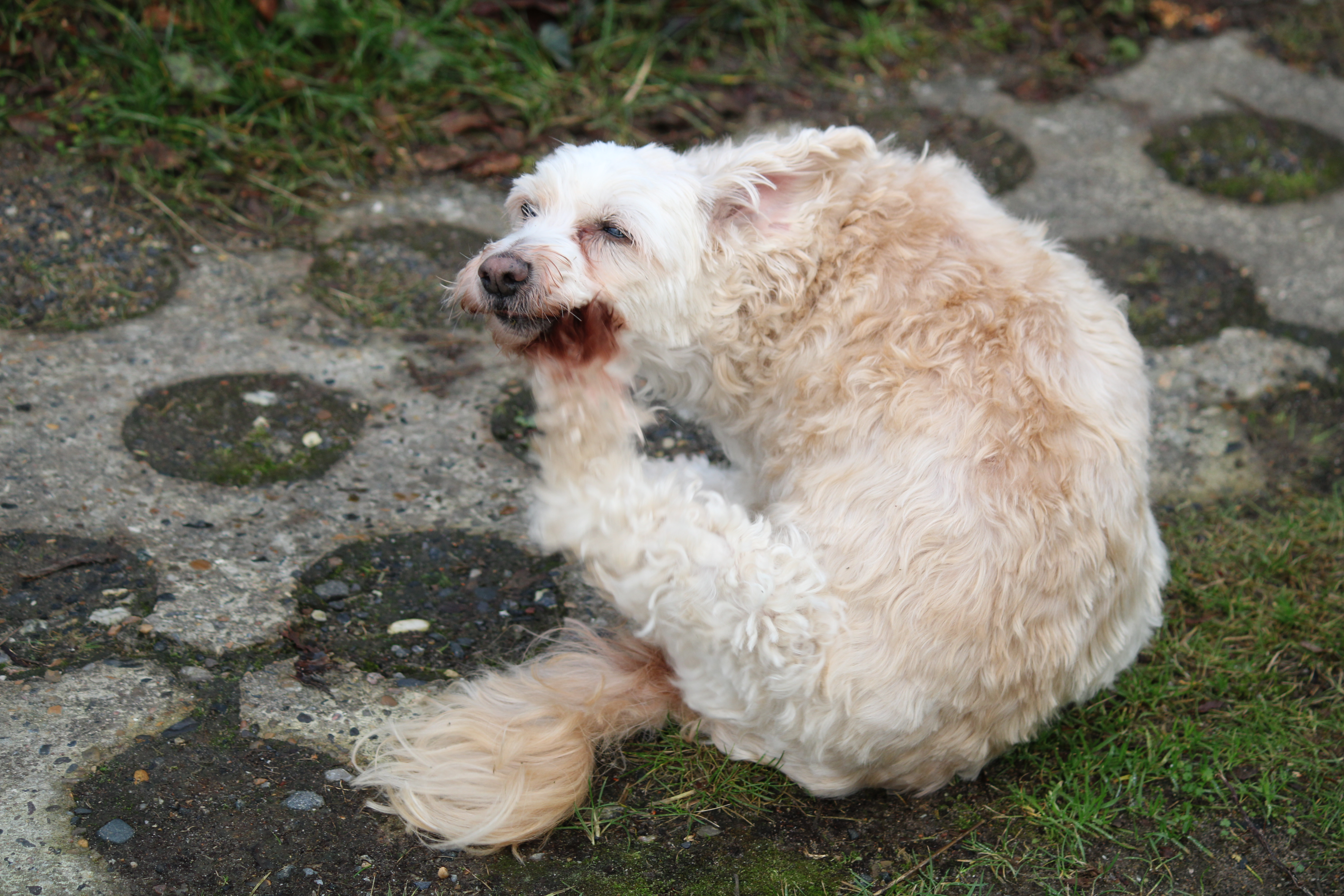
An adult female dog scratching itself near Frederikshavn, 2025

Other reflexes found in the central nervous system include:

- Abdominal reflexes (T6-L1)
- Gastrocolic reflex
- Anocutaneous reflex (S2-S4)
- Baroreflex
- Cough reflex
- Cremasteric reflex (L1-L2)
- Diving reflex
- Lazarus sign
- Muscular defense
- Photic sneeze reflex
- Scratch reflex
- Sneeze
- Startle response
- Withdrawal reflex
  - Crossed extensor reflex

Many of these reflexes are quite complex, requiring a number of synapses in a number of different nuclei in the central nervous system (e.g., the escape reflex). Others of these involve just a couple of synapses to function (e.g., the withdrawal reflex). Processes such as breathing, digestion, and the maintenance of the heartbeat can also be regarded as reflex actions, according to some definitions of the term.

== Grading ==
In medicine, reflexes are often used to assess the health of the nervous system. Doctors will typically grade the activity of a reflex on a scale from 0 to 4. While 2+ is considered normal, some healthy individuals are hypo-reflexive and register all reflexes at 1+, while others are hyper-reflexive and register all reflexes at 3+.

Grade	Description
0	Absent ("mute")
1+ or +	Hypoactive
2+ or ++	"Normal"
3+ or +++	Hyperactive without clonus, with spread to adjacent muscle groups
4+ or ++++	Hyperactive with clonus

Depending on where you are, another way of grading is from –4 (absent) to +4 (clonus), where 0 is "normal".

== Reflex modulation ==
An example of reflex reversal is depicted. Activating the same spinal reflex pathway can cause limb flexion while standing, and extension while walking.

Most reflexes are flexible and can be substantially modified to match the requirements of the behavior in both vertebrates and invertebrates.

A good example of reflex modulation is the stretch reflex. When a muscle is stretched at rest, the stretch reflex leads to contraction of the muscle, thereby opposing stretch (resistance reflex). This helps to stabilize posture. During voluntary movements, however, the intensity (gain) of the reflex is reduced or its sign is even reversed. This prevents resistance reflexes from impeding movements.

The underlying sites and mechanisms of reflex modulation are not fully understood. There is evidence that the output of sensory neurons is directly modulated during behavior—for example, through presynaptic inhibition. The effect of sensory input upon motor neurons is also influenced by interneurons in the spinal cord or ventral nerve cord and by descending signals from the brain.

== Other reflexes ==
Breathing can also be considered both involuntary and voluntary, since breath can be held through internal intercostal muscles.

== History ==
The concept of reflexes dates back to the 17th century with René Descartes. Descartes introduced the idea in his work "Treatise on Man", published posthumously in 1664. He described how the body could perform actions automatically in response to external stimuli without conscious thought. Descartes used the analogy of a mechanical statue to explain how sensory input could trigger motor responses in a deterministic and automatic manner.

The term "reflex" was introduced in the 19th century by the English physiologist Marshall Hall, who is credited with formulating the concept of reflex action and explaining it scientifically. He introduced the term to describe involuntary movements triggered by external stimuli, which are mediated by the spinal cord and the nervous system, distinct from voluntary movements controlled by the brain. Hall's significant work on reflex function was detailed in his 1833 paper, "On the Reflex Function of the Medulla Oblongata and Medulla Spinalis," published in the Philosophical Transactions of the Royal Society, where he provided a clear account of how reflex actions were mediated by the spinal cord, independent of the brain's conscious control, distinguishing them from other neural activities.

== See also ==
- All-or-none law
- Automatic behavior
- Conditioned reflex
- Instinct
- Jumping Frenchmen of Maine
- List of reflexes
- Preflexes
- Voluntary action
