= Muscular defense =

Abdominal muscle reflex

Muscular defense is a reflex of the abdominal muscles to contract upon mechanical force to the abdomen, and serves as protection.

It is a visceromotor reflex, since the parietal peritoneum and viscera are involved in generating the reflex.

== See also ==
- Abdominal guarding
