= Hanger reflex =

Involuntary head rotation phenomenon caused by lateral skin shear on the head

The hanger reflex is a phenomenon in which light compression of the head by a wire hanger or similar object involuntarily induces head rotation toward the side of compression. It was first reported by Japanese researchers and has been studied for its potential applications in rehabilitation, dystonia therapy, and human–computer interaction.

== Overview ==
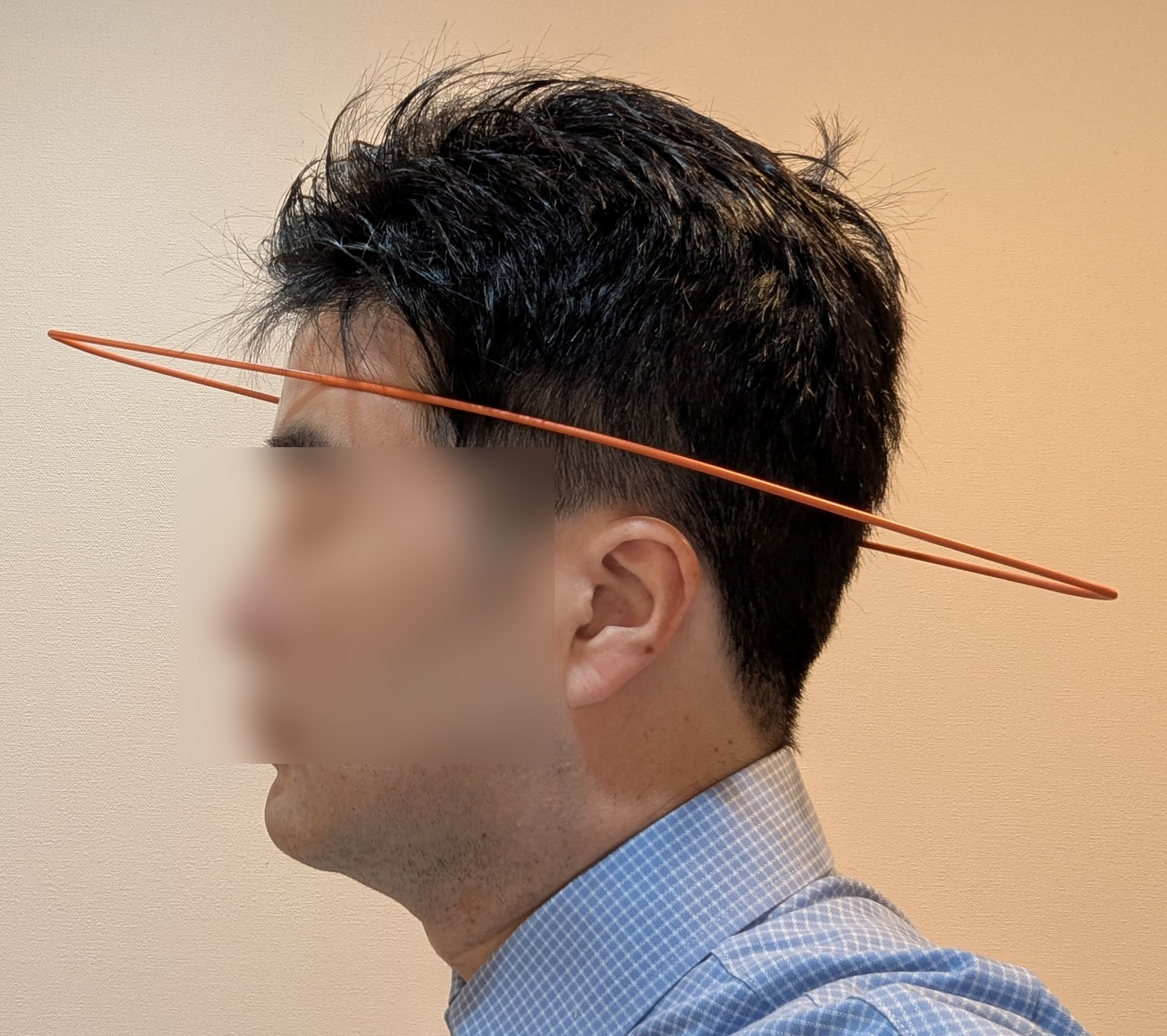
Side view of the hanger reflex

The hanger reflex refers to an involuntary head rotation that occurs when the temporal region of the head is lightly compressed by the edge of a wire hanger. The movement is considered reflexive or illusory rather than intentional. The phenomenon gained public attention through Japanese television programs and online media, often described as "the head turning automatically when a hanger is placed on it."

== Discovery and research history ==
The phenomenon was first introduced to the public on January 20, 1995, in the Japanese TV program Knight Scoop, as an unusual effect in which "the neck naturally turns when a wire hanger is placed on the head." Systematic scientific reports were later published in the late 2000s by Japanese researcher Hiroyuki Kajimoto of the University of Electro-Communications and his collaborators, who formally named it the hanger reflex. They reported that "compression of the anterolateral temporal region and the contralateral posterolateral occipital region induces head rotation."

Clinical applications of the hanger reflex were initiated by Takeshi Asahi of Kanazawa Neurosurgical Hospital in the late 2000s. Their main concept was to use the reflex to relieve rotational symptoms in patients with spasmodic torticollis (cervical dystonia).

In parallel, applications to human–computer interaction were explored. Devices presenting head rotation sensations through tactile stimulation were proposed in the late 2000s. Subsequent work demonstrated similar effects on other body parts, such as the arms, waist, and cheeks, leading to the development of various hanger-reflex-based haptic devices.

Historically, a very similar phenomenon was first reported by J. E. Christensen, of the Institute of International Health, Immunology and Microbiology, University of Copenhagen, in Denmark, on 31 August 1991, in the scientific article "New treatment of spasmodic torticollis", in the medical journal The Lancet, in connection with treatment for spasmodic torticollis. They used a cardboard box to induce the phenomenon of head rotation; however, the phenomenon that actually occurs is considered to be the hanger reflex itself.

The phenomenon gained attention on social media in 2020 and again in 2022, becoming known as The Hanger Challenge, with people posting videos of the reflex in action.

== Mechanisms and hypotheses ==
The neurophysiological mechanism underlying the hanger reflex remains unclear, but several hypotheses have been proposed:

- Skin-shear stimulation hypothesis: Lateral skin displacement caused by the hanger induces an illusory force sensation toward the direction of shear.
- Proprioceptive stimulation hypothesis: Stimulation of muscle spindles or tendon organs biases the postural control system of the head.

These hypotheses highlight the interaction between tactile and proprioceptive feedback. In support of the skin-shear hypothesis, studies have shown that lateral stretching of the facial skin alone can induce similar rotational sensations, suggesting that direct pressure is not essential.

If lateral skin displacement is the main cause, one might expect adhesive tapes to produce the same effect; however, typical taping produces opposing shear directions at the start and end points, canceling out the effect. In contrast, compression by a hanger generates consistent shear directions at multiple contact points, avoiding this cancellation.

The hanger reflex is also known to be enhanced by superimposed vibration, though whether this is due to augmented tactile feedback or proprioceptive synergy is not yet clear.

Several neurophysiological studies have been conducted to investigate the mechanisms underlying the hanger reflex. For example, an asymmetric reduction in vestibular response during the hanger reflex has been reported. In addition, electromyographic measurements of neck muscle activity during the hanger reflex have been performed.

== Wearing method ==
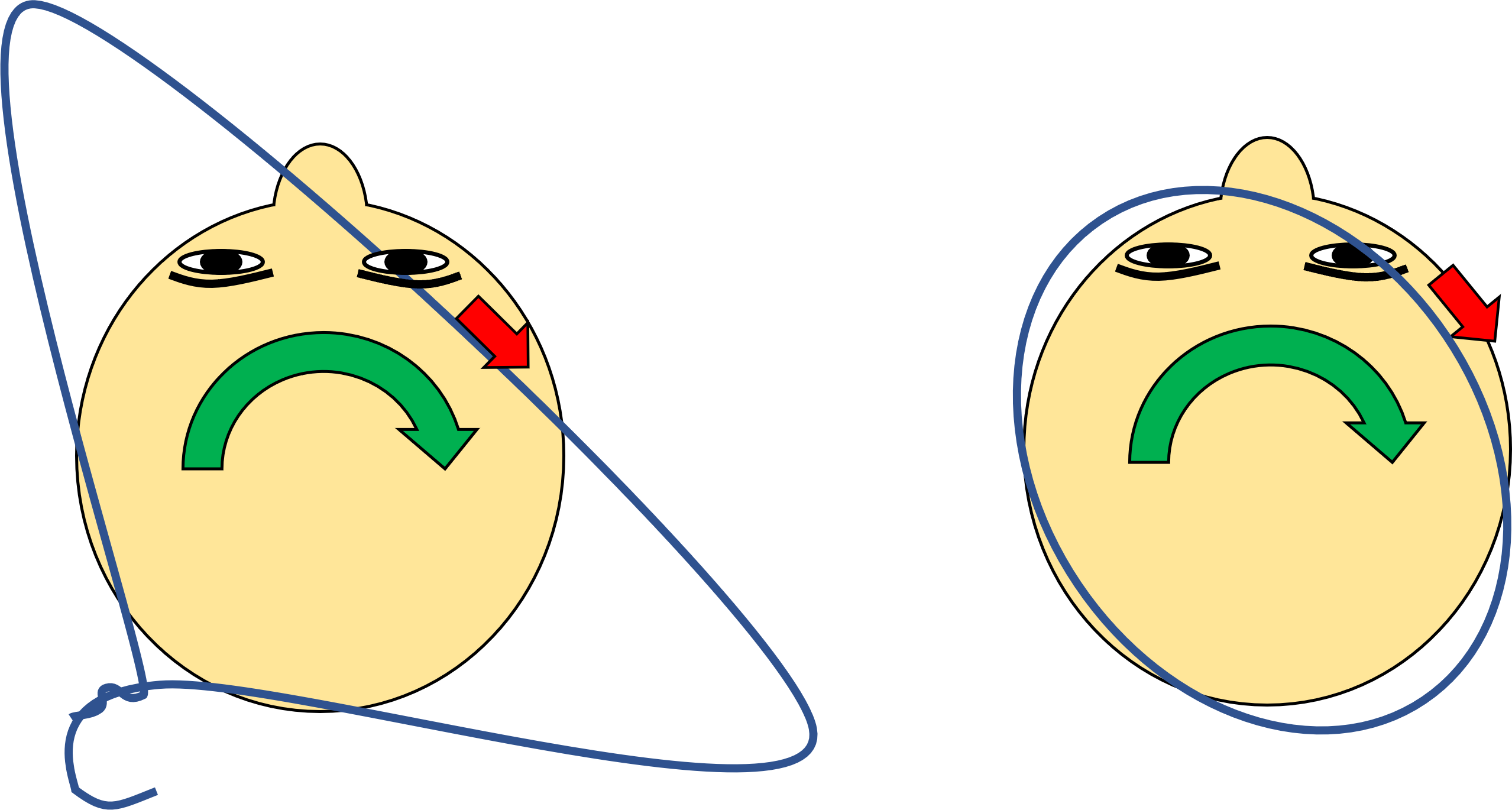
Principle of the hanger reflex

As the effect depends on lateral skin displacement, proper fitting is essential. When using a wire hanger, the long edge of the triangular frame should contact the anterior temporal or frontal region. Because the human head is not perfectly circular, the hanger tends to rotate along the head's longitudinal axis, creating shear on the skin that induces head rotation—toward the right when pressing the right temple, and toward the left when pressing the left temple.

This explains individual variability in susceptibility: individuals with more circular head cross-sections experience weaker effects. It also rules out the "rebound against perceived external force" explanation sometimes seen in media descriptions.

In applied devices, simple wire hangers are rarely used; instead, metal or resin oval rings, sometimes with pneumatic actuation inside, are employed to efficiently generate lateral skin displacement.

== Applications ==
Research on the hanger reflex has extended to medical and engineering applications.

Application to dystonia

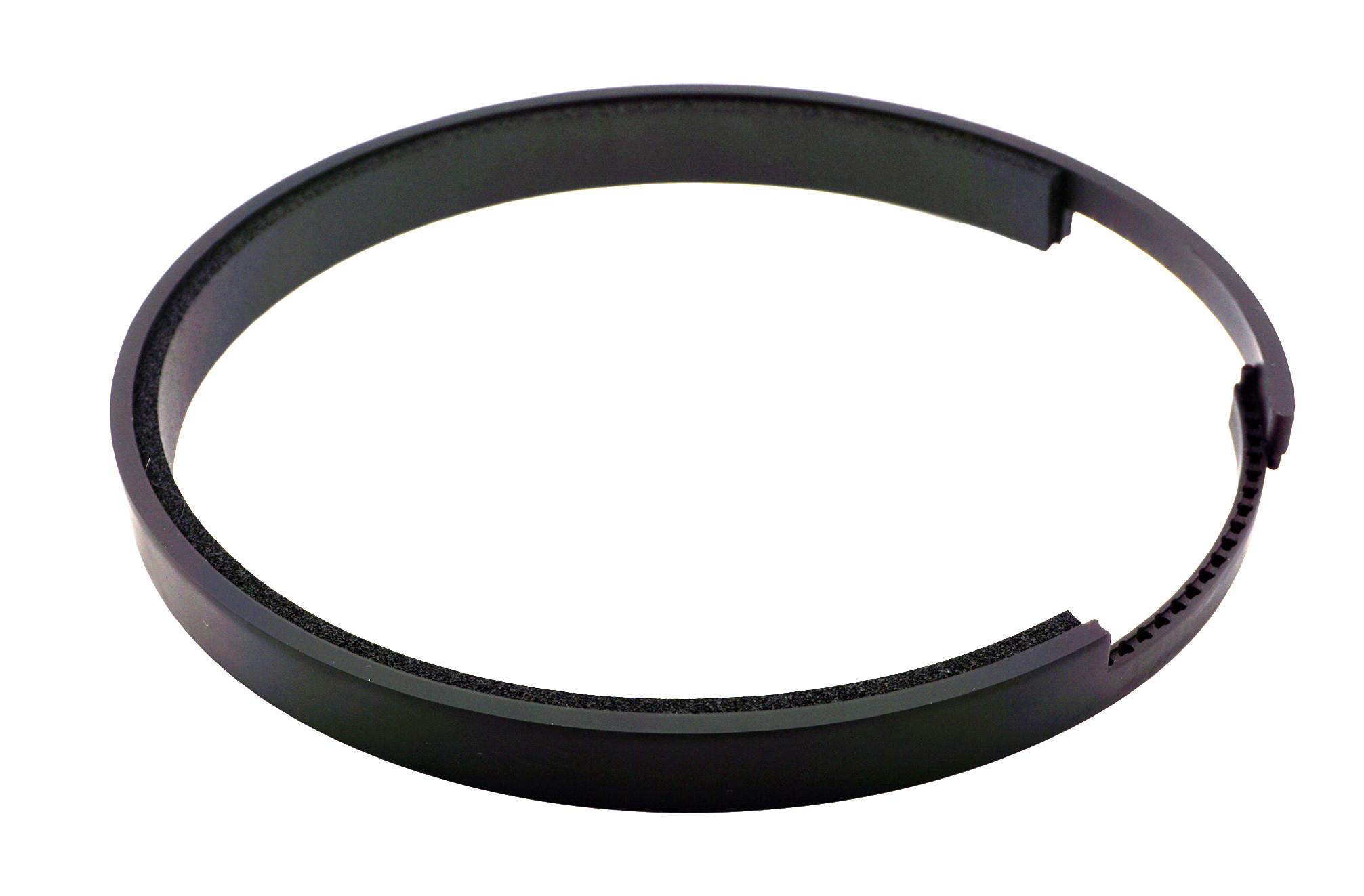
Example of Hanger Reflex Device

Numerous studies have examined the hanger reflex for treating dystonia. Although primarily targeting the neck, a case of runner's dystonia treated with an ankle hanger device has also been reported.

In these applications, devices employing rings made of metal or resin are widely used and have been commercialized. An elliptical ring is worn on the head, and by rotating it, the elastic force of the ring is applied to the anterior temporal region. This applies appropriate pressure to the site that induces the aforementioned Hanger Reflex, causing skin deformation.

Rehabilitation

Full-body hanger reflex–based systems have been proposed for remote rehabilitation and somatosensory sharing.

Human–computer interfaces

Because the hanger reflex originates from lateral skin shear, it can be induced across the body, leading to numerous HCI applications. In head-mounted displays, it has been used to present haptic head rotation sensations, and to transmit remote users' head rotation sensations intuitively.

Waist-mounted hanger reflex devices have been used for gait control and navigation, and have been adapted to personal mobility control.

Devices applying the reflex to shoulder elevation or elbow rotation have also been developed. Combining the hanger reflex with other modalities, such as electrical muscle stimulation, has been explored for efficient motion instruction.

== See also ==
- Somatosensory system
- Dystonia
- Human–computer interaction
