= Ankle jerk reflex =

Physiological stretch reflex

The ankle jerk reflex, also known as the Achilles reflex, occurs when the Achilles tendon is tapped while the foot is dorsiflexed. It is a type of stretch reflex that tests the function of the gastrocnemius muscle and the nerve that supplies it. A positive result would be the jerking of the foot towards its plantar surface. Being a deep tendon reflex, it is monosynaptic. It is also a stretch reflex. These are monosynaptic spinal segmental reflexes. When they are intact, integrity of the following is confirmed: cutaneous innervation, motor supply, and cortical input to the corresponding spinal segment.

== Root value ==
This reflex is mediated by the S1 spinal segment of the spinal cord.

== Procedure and components ==
Ankle of the patient is relaxed. It is helpful to support the ball of the foot at least somewhat to put some tension in the Achilles tendon, but don’t completely dorsiflex the ankle. A small strike is given on the Achilles tendon using a rubber hammer to elicit the response. If the practitioner is not able to elicit a response, a Jendrassik maneuver can be tried by having the patient cup their fingers on each hand and try to pull the hands apart. A positive response is marked by a brisk plantarflexion of the foot. The response is also graded into Grade 0-4 according to the reflex grading system.

== Absent ankle jerk ==
The Achilles reflex checks if the S_{1} and S_{2} nerve roots are intact and could be indicative of sciatic nerve pathology. It is classically delayed in hypothyroidism. This reflex is usually absent in disk herniations at the L_{5}—S_{1} level. A reduction in the ankle jerk reflex may also be indicative of peripheral neuropathy.

=== Common causes ===
- Lumbar herniated disk syndrome
- Lumbar spinal stenosis
- Endocrine disorders
  - Hypothyroidism
- Sciatic neuropathy
- Lumbosacral plexus disorder
- Amyotrophic lateral sclerosis
- Cauda equina syndrome
- Lumbar radiculopathy
- Holmes-Adie syndrome
- Idiopathic
- Trauma
  - Concussion, spinal cord
- Hypothermia
- Infectious diseases
  - Tabes dorsalis
  - Poliomyelitis, acute
  - Lumbar disk infection/pyogenic
  - Arachnoiditis lumbosacral
- Neoplastic disorders
  - Primary
  - Secondary
- Allergic, collagen, autoimmune diseases
- Diabetic neuropathy

=== Rarer causes ===
- Abetalipoproteinemia
- Electrolyte abnormalities
  - Hypokalemia
- Deficiency disorders
  - Vitamin E deficiency
- Congenital developmental disorders
  - Spina bifida
- Genetic disorders
  - Hypokalemic periodic paralysis
  - Charcot–Marie–Tooth disease
  - Spinal muscular atrophy
  - Friedreich's ataxia
- Drugs
  - Tubocurarine
  - Pyridoxine excess/megadose
  - Chronic alcoholism

== Ankle clonus ==
Grade 4 ankle hyperreflexia is called ankle clonus. There is repetitive ankle dorsiflexion and plantarflexion on passive dorsiflexion of the foot by the examiner till the force applied by the examiner is withdrawn.

=== Causes ===
Any spinal cord lesions, be it traumatic, neoplastic, pyogenic, vascular above the level of S1 can cause clonus. This is because of the spasticity caused by the UMN type of injury causing hyperreflexia and clonus. Some other causes of clonus are

- Meningitis
- Tetanus
- CJD
- Cerebral palsy
- Multiple sclerosis
- Syringomyelia
- Pre-eclampsia

== See also ==
- Tonic vibration reflex
