= Triceps reflex =

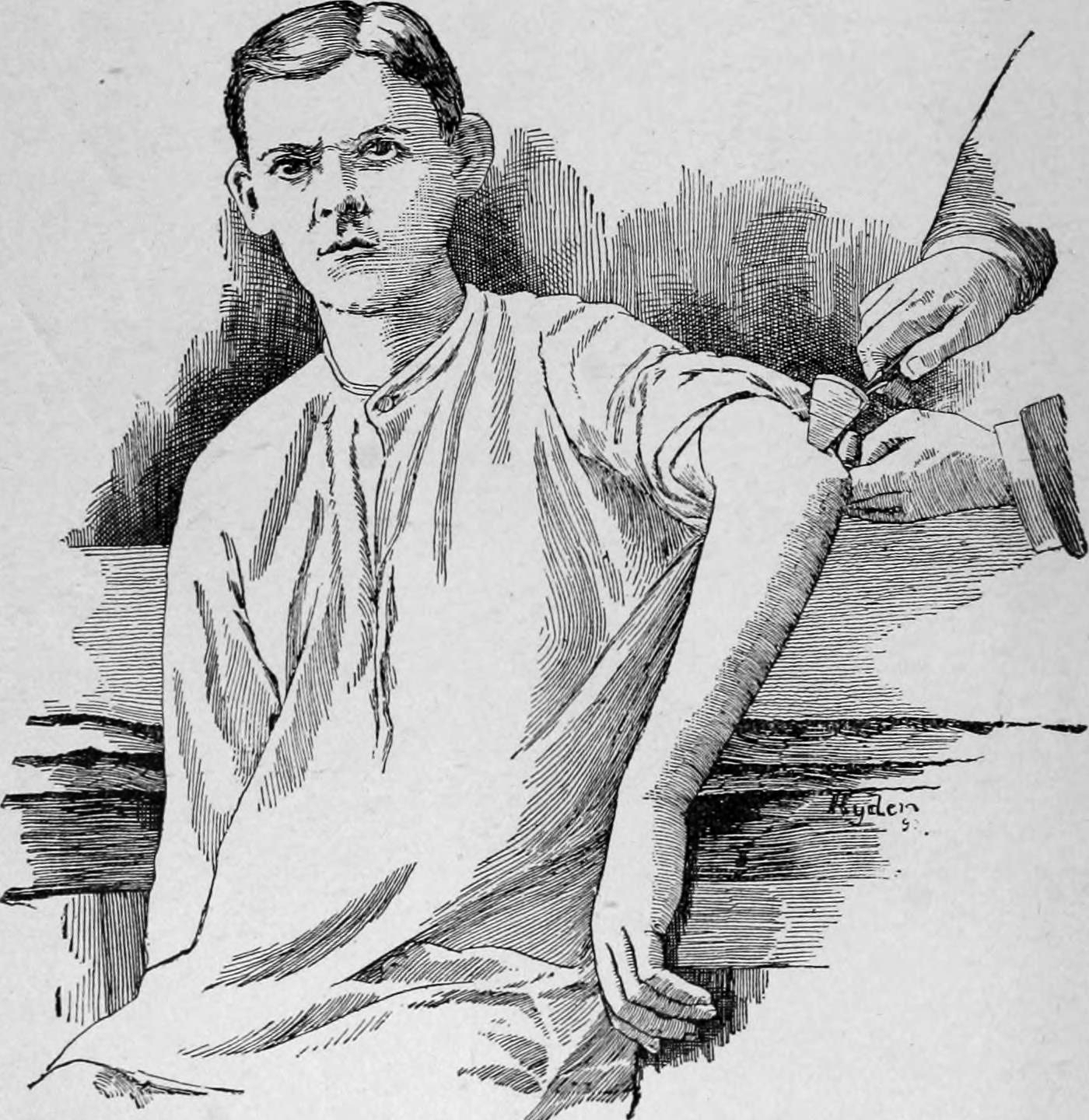
Illustration of a doctor using a medical hammer on a person's triceps

The triceps reflex is a deep tendon reflex that elicits involuntary contraction of the triceps brachii muscle. It is sensed and transmitted by the radial nerve. The reflex is tested as part of the neurological examination to assess the sensory and motor pathways within the C7 and C8 spinal nerves.

== Testing ==
The test can be performed by tapping the triceps tendon with the sharp end of a reflex hammer while the forearm is hanging loose at a right angle to the arm. A sudden contraction of the triceps muscle causes extension, and indicates a normal reflex.

== Reflex arc ==
The arc involves stretch receptors in the triceps tendon, from which information travels along the radial nerve, through the C7/C8 nerve root to the spinal cord, and the motor signal for contraction returns through the radial nerve.

== Test indicators ==
- Absence of a reflex (areflexia): If no reflex is elicited then it is essential to try again with reinforcement, with the patient clenching his or her teeth just as the reflex hammer strikes. If true, it can indicate a lower motor neuron lesion or a problem in the neuromuscular junction.
- Hyperreflexia (a response far larger than considered normal): Indicates a potential upper motor neuron lesion.

== Absence of reflex ==
An absence of reflex can be an indicator of several medical conditions: Myopathy, neuropathy, spondylosis, sensory nerve disease, neuritis, potential lower motor neuron lesion, or poliomyelitis.

Other medical problems that may cause irregular reflexes include Hyperthyroidism.

== See also ==
- Reflex arc
- Reflex
- Golgi tendon organ
