= Galant reflex =

Newborn reflex

Galant reflex, or truncal incurvation reflex, is a newborn reflex, named after neurologist Johann Susmann Galant. It is elicited by holding the newborn in ventral suspension (face down) and stroking along the one side of the spine. The normal reaction is for the newborn to laterally flex toward the stimulated side.

This is one of the reflexes tested in newborns to help rule out brain damage at birth.

== See also ==
- Terms for anatomical location
- Anatomical terms of motion
- Primitive reflexes
