= Abdominal reflex =

Superficial neurological reflex

An abdominal reflex is a superficial neurological reflex stimulated by stroking of the abdomen around the umbilicus. It can be helpful in determining the level of a central nervous system (CNS) lesion. Being a superficial reflex, it is polysynaptic (involving multiple connections between nerves).

== Test ==
The abdomen is mentally divided into four quadrants, and the skin in each quadrant is gently stroked, on the diagonal, towards the navel. The navel should twitch towards the stimulus.

== Roots involved ==
Thoracic 8th – 12th segments are involved.

== Absent abdominal reflex ==
Abdominal reflex is noted as either present or absent. An absent response can be physiological. Physiological absent response can be due to obesity, frailty, or muscle laxity after multiple pregnancies or abdominal surgery. It is not unusual for this reflex to be absent in children.

If the reflex is absent, or especially if it is asymmetric, it can indicate a neurological problem somewhere above the lower thoracic spine.

Pathological absence can be due to:

- Multiple sclerosis
- Motor neuron disease (late)
- Neurogenic bladder
- Brown-Séquard syndrome
- Chiari malformations

== Evolutionary significance ==
The local contraction of the abdominal muscles to an abdominal sensory stimulus was to protect the internal viscera from damage.
