= Interneuron =

Neurons that are not motor or sensory

- “Relay neurons” are interneurons that act as a bridge between neurons.

Details
- Location: Nervous system

Identifiers
- MeSH: D007395
- NeuroLex ID: birnlex_2534
- TH: H2.00.06.1.00058
- FMA: 67313

Interneurons (also called internuncial neurons, association neurons, connector neurons, or intermediate neurons) are neurons that are not specifically motor neurons or sensory neurons. Interneurons are the central nodes of neural circuits, enabling communication between sensory or motor neurons and the central nervous system (CNS). They play vital roles in reflexes, neuronal oscillations, and neurogenesis in the adult mammalian brain.

Interneurons can be further broken down into two groups: local interneurons and relay interneurons. Local interneurons have short axons and form circuits with nearby neurons to analyze small pieces of information. Relay interneurons have long axons and connect circuits of neurons in one region of the brain with those in other regions. However, interneurons are generally considered to operate mainly within local brain areas. The interaction between interneurons allows the brain to perform complex functions such as learning and decision-making.

== Structure ==
In the human brain, approximately 20–30% of the neurons in the neocortex are interneurons, and the remaining majority of neurons are pyramidal. Investigations into the molecular diversity of neurons is impeded by the inability to isolate cell populations born at different times for gene expression analysis. An effective means of identifying coetaneous interneurons is neuronal birthdating. This can be achieved using nucleoside analogs such as EdU.

In 2008, a nomenclature for the features of GABAergic cortical interneurons was proposed, called Petilla terminology.

=== Spinal cord ===
- Ia inhibitory interneuron: Found in lamina VII. Responsible for inhibiting antagonist motor neuron. 1a spindle afferents activate 1a inhibitory neuron.
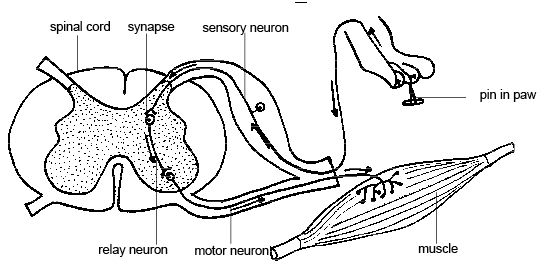
- A spinal interneuron (relay neuron) forms part of a reflex arc
  Ib inhibitory interneuron: Found in lamina V, VI, VII. Afferent or Golgi tendon organ activates it.

=== Cortex ===
- Parvalbumin-expressing interneurons
- CCK-expressing interneurons
- VIP-expressing interneurons
- SOM-expressing interneurons

=== Cerebellum ===
- Molecular layer (basket cells, stellate cells)
- Golgi cells
- Granule cells
- Lugaro cells
- Unipolar brush cells

=== Striatum ===
- Parvalbumin-expressing interneurons
- Cholinergic interneurons
- Tyrosine hydroxylase-expressing interneurons
- Calretinin-expressing interneurons
- Nitric oxide synthase-expressing interneurons

== Function ==
Interneurons in the CNS are primarily inhibitory, and use the neurotransmitter GABA or glycine. However, excitatory interneurons using glutamate in the CNS also exist, as do interneurons releasing neuromodulators like acetylcholine.

In addition to these general functions, interneurons in the insect CNS play a number of specific roles in different parts of the nervous system, and also are either excitatory or inhibitory. For example, in the olfactory system, interneurons are responsible for integrating information from odorant receptors and sending signals to the mushroom bodies, which are involved in learning and memory. In the visual system, interneurons are responsible for processing motion information and sending signals to the optic lobes, which are involved in visual navigation.

Interneurons are also important for coordinating complex behaviors, such as flight and locomotion. For example, interneurons in the thoracic ganglia are responsible for coordinating the activity of the leg muscles during walking and flying.

Interneurons' main function is to provide a neural circuit, conducting flow of signals or information between sensory neurons and motor neurons.
