= Symmetrical tonic neck reflex =

Primitive reflex

The symmetrical tonic neck reflex (STNR) is a primitive reflex that normally emerges during the first month of an infant's life and is diminished by the age of 9–10 months. It is a bridging or transitional brainstem reflex that is an important developmental stage and is necessary for a baby to transition from lying on the floor to quadruped crawling or walking. In order to progress beyond this development stage, the baby needs to have been successful in unlinking the automatic movement of the head from the automatic movement of the arms and legs.

The STNR is normally fully developed by 6–8 months and significantly diminished by 2–3 years. If this reflex is retained beyond 2–3 years to such a degree that it "modifies voluntary movement", the child is considered to have "immature and abnormal reflex development", and this can have broad effects on the child's later development.

== Testing ==
The symmetrical tonic neck reflex can be tested by placing the child in quadruped position on the floor and passively flexing the head forward and then extend it backwards. The expected response would be forward head flexion producing flexion of the upper extremities and extension of the lower extremities while extension of the head will produce extension of the upper extremities and flexion of the lower extremities.

== Significance ==
This reflex can help the child to come to quadruped or crawling position but does not allow crawling because when the neck flexes forward, the upper limbs flex and lower limbs go into extension. This reflex is not normally easily seen or elicited in normal infants but may be seen in an exaggerated form in many children with cerebral palsy.

== See also ==
- Asymmetrical tonic neck reflex
