= Tonic vibration reflex =

Sustained contraction of vibrated muscle

Tonic vibration reflex is a sustained contraction of a muscle subjected to vibration. This reflex is caused by vibratory activation of muscle spindles — muscle receptors sensitive to stretch.

Tonic vibration reflex is evoked by placing a vibrator — which in this case is typically an electrical motor with an eccentric load on its shaft — on a muscle's tendon. 30–100 Hz vibration activates receptors of the skin, tendons and, most importantly, muscle spindles. Muscle spindle discharges are sent to the spinal cord through afferent nerve fibers, where they activate polysynaptic reflex arcs, causing the muscle to contract.

The effects of sustained vibratory stimulation on muscle contraction, posture and kinesthetic perceptions are much more complex than merely contraction of the muscle being vibrated.

Russian scientists Victor Gurfinkel, Mikhail Lebedev, Andrew Polyakov and Yuri Levick used vibratory stimulation to study human posture control and spectral characteristics of electromyographic (EMG) activity.

== See also ==
- Tendon reflex
- H-reflex
