= Asymmetrical tonic neck reflex =

Temporal reflex action in infants usually for a period of about six months

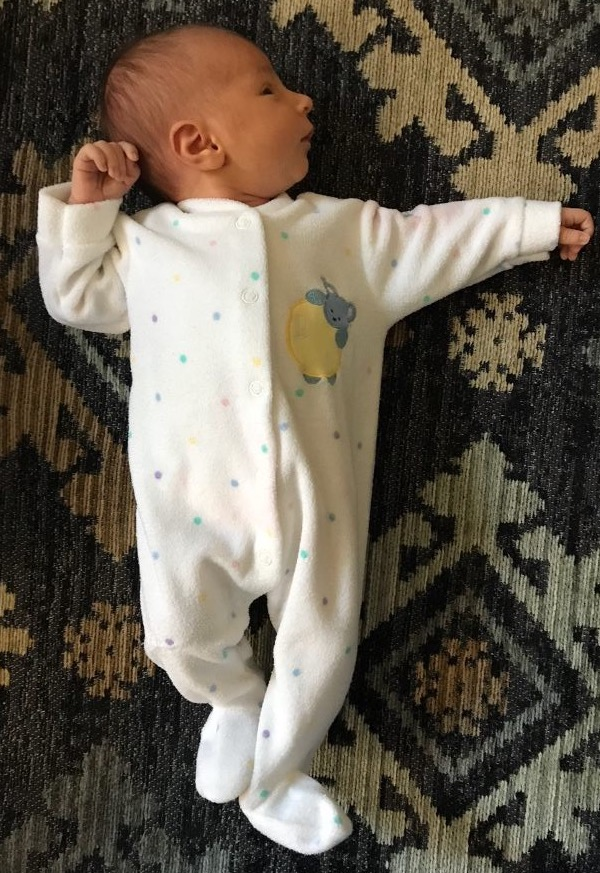
The asymmetrical tonic neck reflex (ATNR) in a two-week-old female, with extension of the left extremities and flexion of the right

The asymmetrical tonic neck reflex (ATNR) is a primitive reflex found in newborn humans that normally vanishes around 6 months of age. It is also known as the bow and arrow or "fencing reflex" because of the characteristic position of the infant's arms and head, which resembles that of a fencer. When the face is turned to one side, the arm and leg on that side extend, and the arm and leg on the opposite side flex. It is more likely to be seen in premature infants than full-term babies. It is rare in newborns but can be stimulated from infants to up to 3 months old. It is believed to help develop hand-eye coordination and help with awareness of both sides of the body.

The presence of the ATNR, as well as other primitive reflexes, such as the tonic labyrinthine reflex (TLR), beyond the first six months of life may indicate that the child has developmental delays, at which point the reflex is atypical or abnormal. For example, in children with cerebral palsy, the reflexes may persist and even be more pronounced. As abnormal reflexes, both the ATNR and the TLR can cause problems for the growing child. The ATNR and TLR both hinder functional activities such as rolling, bringing the hands together, or even bringing the hands to the mouth. Over time, both the ATNR and TLR can cause serious damage to the growing child's joints and bones. The ATNR can cause the spine to curve (scoliosis). Both the ATNR and TLR can cause subluxation of the femoral head or dislocation of the femoral head as it completely moves out of the hip socket. When abnormal reflexes persist in a child, evidence suggests early intervention involving extensive physical therapy as the most beneficial course of treatment.

The fencing response occurs in adults as a result of mechanical forces applied to the head, typically associated with contact sports. The fencing response is transient and indicates moderate forces applied to the brainstem, resulting in a traumatic brain injury.

== See also ==
- Symmetrical tonic neck reflex
