= Brachioradialis reflex =

The brachioradialis reflex (also known as supinator reflex ) is observed during a neurological exam by striking the brachioradialis tendon (at its insertion at the base of the wrist into the radial styloid process (radial side of wrist around 4 inches (102 mm) proximal to base of thumb) directly with a reflex hammer when the patient's arm is relaxing. This reflex is carried by the radial nerve (spinal level: C5, C6)

The reflex should cause slight pronation or supination and slight elbow flexion. Contrary to popular belief, this reflex should not cause wrist extension and/or radial deviation, because the brachioradialis does not cross the wrist.
