= Reflex arc =

Neural pathway which controls a reflex

In a reflex arc, an action potential can bypass the brain for processing and uses dedicated neural pathways for faster processing. When a stimulus (A) is met at the signal from that stimulus will travel up the sensory neuron (B, in green) to the spinal column (C). There it will likely pass through a short interneuron (D, in purple) before continuing down a motor neuron (E, in blue) to the origin of the signal. Then, a contraction of the muscles (F, in red) is triggered, moving the bone (G).

A reflex arc is a neural pathway that controls a reflex. In vertebrates, most sensory neurons synapse in the spinal cord and the signal then travels through it into the brain. This allows for faster reflex actions to occur by activating spinal motor neurons without the delay of routing signals through the brain. The brain will receive the input while the reflex is being carried out and the analysis of the signal takes place after the reflex action.

There are two types: autonomic reflex arc (affecting inner organs) and somatic reflex arc (affecting muscles). Autonomic reflexes sometimes involve the spinal cord and some somatic reflexes are mediated more by the brain than the spinal cord.

During a somatic reflex, nerve signals travel along the following pathway:

1. Somatic receptors in the skin, muscles and tendons
2. Afferent nerve fibers carry signals from the somatic receptors to the posterior horn of the spinal cord or to the brainstem
3. An integrating center, the point at which the neurons that compose the gray matter of the spinal cord or brainstem synapse
4. Efferent nerve fibers carry motor nerve signals from the anterior horn to the muscles
5. Effector muscle innervated by the efferent nerve fiber carries out the response.

A reflex arc, then, is the pathway followed by nerves which (a.) carry sensory information from the receptor to the spinal cord, and then (b.) carry the response generated by the spinal cord to effector organs during a reflex action. The pathway taken by the nerve impulse to accomplish a reflex action is called the reflex arc.

== Monosynaptic vs. polysynaptic ==
Reflex arc demonstrated

When a reflex arc in an animal consists of only one sensory neuron and one motor neuron, it is defined as monosynaptic, referring to the presence of a single chemical synapse. In the case of peripheral muscle reflexes (patellar reflex, achilles reflex), brief stimulation to the muscle spindle results in contraction of the agonist or effector muscle. By contrast, in polysynaptic reflex pathways, one or more interneurons connect afferent (sensory) and efferent (motor) signals. All but the most simple reflexes are polysynaptic, allowing processing or inhibition of polysynaptic reflexes within the brain.

== The patellar reflex (aka "knee jerk") ==
(A) Microscopic hairs etched along the tail of the decapod activate a somatic signal (2) in response to the presence of an environmental stimulus (1). (B) The action potential activated by the somatic interneuron (3) relays an impulse to the lateral giant (LG) interneuron (4). (C) The lateral giant interneuron executes a reflex by relaying impulses to various giant motor neurons (5) within the abdomen of the lobster. These muscular contractions result in the decapod being capable of successfully propelling itself through the water, away from the site of stimulus.

When the patellar tendon is tapped just below the knee, the tap initiates an action potential in a specialized structure known as a muscle spindle located within the quadriceps. This action potential travels to the L3 and L4 nerve roots of the spinal cord, via a sensory axon which chemically communicates by releasing glutamate onto a motor nerve. The result of this motor nerve activity is contraction of the quadriceps muscle, leading to extension of the lower leg at the knee (i.e. the lower leg kicks forward). Ultimately, an improper patellar reflex may indicate an injury of the central nervous system.

The sensory input from the quadriceps also activates local interneurons that release the inhibitory neurotransmitter glycine onto motor neurons of antagonist muscles, blocking their stimulation (in this case the hamstring muscles). The relaxation of the opposing muscle facilitates (by not opposing) the extension of the lower leg.

In invertebrates reflex interneurons do not necessarily reside in the spinal cord, for example as in the lateral giant neuron of crayfish.

== See also ==
- Lazarus sign
