= Focal neurologic signs =

Impairments in nervous system function affecting a specific region of the body

- Differential diagnosis: Head trauma, Tumor, Stroke

Focal neurologic signs, also known as focal neurological deficits or focal CNS signs, are impairments of nerve, spinal cord, or brain function that affect a specific region of the body, e.g. weakness in the left arm, the right leg, paresis, or plegia.

Focal neurological deficits may be caused by a variety of medical conditions such as head trauma, tumors or stroke; or by various diseases such as meningitis or encephalitis or as a side effect of certain medications such as those used in anesthesia.

Neurological soft signs are a group of non-focal neurologic signs.

== Frontal lobe signs ==
Frontal lobe signs usually involve the motor system and may include many special types of deficit, depending on which part of the frontal lobe is affected:

- unsteady gait (unsteadiness in walking)
- muscular rigidity, resistance to passive movements of the limbs (hypertonia)
- paralysis of a limb (monoparesis) or a larger area on one side of the body (hemiparesis)
- paralysis head and eye movements
- inability to express oneself linguistically, described as an expressive aphasia (Broca's aphasia)
- focal seizures that may spread to adjacent areas (Jacksonian seizure)
- grand mal or tonic-clonic seizures
- changes in personality such as disinhibition, inappropriate jocularity, rage without provocation; or loss of initiative and concern, apathy, akinetic mutism, general retardation
- "frontal release" signs, i.e. reappearance of primitive reflexes such as the snout reflex, the grasp reflex, and the palmomental reflex
- unilateral loss of smell (anosmia)

== Parietal lobe signs ==
Parietal lobe signs usually involve somatic sensation, and may include:

- impairment of tactile sensation
- impairment of proprioception, i.e. postural sensation and sensation of passive movement
- sensory and visual neglect syndromes, i.e. inability to pay attention to things in certain parts of the person's sensory or spatial environment; this may be as extreme as denial of a limb
- loss of ability to read, write, or calculate (dyslexia, dysgraphia, dyscalculia)
- loss of ability to find a defined place (geographical agnosia)
- loss of ability to identify objects based on touch (astereognosia)

== Temporal lobe signs ==
Temporal lobe signs usually involve auditory sensation and memory, and may include:

- deafness without damage to the structures of the ear, described as cortical deafness
- tinnitus, auditory hallucinations
- loss of ability to comprehend music or language, described as a sensory aphasia (Wernicke's aphasia)
- amnesia, memory loss (affecting either long- or short-term memory or both)
- other memory disturbances, such as déjà vu
- complex, multimodal hallucinations
- complex partial seizures (temporal lobe epilepsy)

== Occipital lobe signs ==
Occipital lobe signs usually involve visual sensation, and may include:

- total loss of vision (cortical blindness)
- loss of vision with denial of the loss (Anton's syndrome)
- loss of vision on one side of the visual field of both eyes (homonymous hemianopsia)
- visual agnosias, i.e. inability to recognize familiar objects, colors, or faces
- visual illusions such as micropsia (objects appear smaller) and macropsia (objects appear larger)
- visual hallucinations, displaying elementary forms, such as zig-zags and flashes, in one half of the visual field only for each eye (in contrast, temporal lobe visual hallucinations display complex forms, and fill the entire visual field)

== Limbic signs ==
Damage to the limbic system involves loss or damage to memory, and may include:

- loss or confusion of long-term memory prior to focal neuropathy (retrograde amnesia)
- inability to form new memories (anterograde amnesia)
- loss of, or reduced emotions (apathy)
- loss of olfactory functions
- loss of decision-making ability

== Cerebellar signs ==
Cerebellar signs usually involve balance and coordination, and may include:

- cerebellar ataxia a gait with a broad base; the patient falters to the side of the lesion (ataxia)
- inability to coordinate fine motor activities (intention tremor), e.g. "past-pointing" (pointing beyond the finger in the finger-nose test)
- inability to perform rapid alternating movements (dysdiadochokinesia), e.g. inability to rapidly flip the hands
- involuntary horizontal eye movements (nystagmus)
- dysarthria, usually with bilateral lesions; the speech has a halting jerking quality (scanning speech or staccato speech)

== Brainstem signs ==
Brainstem signs can involve a host of specific sensory and motor abnormalities, depending on which fiber tracts and cranial nerve nuclei are affected.

== Spinal cord signs ==
Spinal cord signs generally involve unilateral paralysis with contralateral loss of pain sensation.

== Neurological soft signs ==
Neurological soft signs (NSS) are a group of minor non-focal neurological signs that include synkinesis. Other soft signs including clumsiness, and loss of fine motor movement are also commonly found in schizophrenia. NSS likely reflect impairments in sensory integration, motor coordination, and the carrying out of complex motor tasks. When associated with schizophrenia the signs stop if clinical symptoms are effectively treated; and a consensus suggests that they may constitute a state marker for schizophrenia.

== See also ==
- Focal and diffuse brain injury
