= Child development stages =

Theoretical milestones of child development

Child development stages are the theoretical milestones of child development, some of which are asserted in nativist theories. This article discusses the most widely accepted developmental stages in children. There exists a wide variation in terms of what is considered "normal", caused by variations in genetic, cognitive, physical, family, cultural, nutritional, educational, and environmental factors. Many children reach some or most of these milestones at different times from the norm.

Holistic development sees the child in the round, as a whole person – physically, emotionally, intellectually, socially, morally, culturally, and spiritually. Learning about child development involves studying patterns of growth and development, from which guidelines for 'normal' development are construed. Developmental norms are sometimes called milestones – they define the recognized development pattern that children are expected to follow. Each child develops uniquely; however, using norms helps in understanding these general patterns of development while recognizing the wide variation between individuals.

One way to identify pervasive developmental disorders is if infants fail to meet the developmental milestones in time or at all.

== Table of milestones ==
Approximate outline of development periods in postnatal human development until what generally is regarded as adulthood. There are no universally unanimous definitions, so they vary considerably, but generally fall within the faded intervals at the flanks of the periods.

Developmental milestones
Age	Motor	Speech	Vision and hearing	Social
1–1.5 months	When held upright, it holds its head erect and steady.	Cooes and babbles at parents and people they know	Focuses on parents.	Loves looking at new faces; Starts to smile at parents; Startled by sudden noises; Recognition of familiar individuals
1.6–2 months	When prone, lifts self by arms; rolls from side to back.	Vocalizes; Cooes (makes vowel-like noises) or babbles.	Focuses on objects as well as adults	Loves looking at new faces; Smiles at the parent; Starting to smile
2.1–2.5 months	Rolls from tummy to side; Rests on elbows, lifts head 90 degrees; Sits propped up with hands, head steady for a short time	Changes sounds while verbalizing, "eee-ahhh"; Verbalizes to engage someone in an interaction; Blows bubbles, plays with tongue; Deep belly laughs	Hand regard: following the hand with the eyes; Color vision adult-like.	Serves to practice emerging visual skills. Also observed in blind children.
3 months	Prone: head held up for prolonged periods; No grasp reflex	Makes vowel noises	Follows dangling toy from side to side; Turns head around to sound. Follows adults' gaze (joint attention); Sensitivity to binocular cues emerges.	Squeals with delight appropriately; Discriminates smile. Smiles often; Laughs at simple things.; Reaches out for objects.
5 months	Holds head steady; Goes for objects and gets them; Objects taken to the mouth	Enjoys vocal play	Able to reach hanging objects and grab them; Noticing colors	Adjusts hand shape to the shape of the toy before picking up
6 months	Transfers objects from one hand to the other; Pulls self up to sit and sits erect with supports; Rolls over from tummy to back; Palmar grasp of cube hand to hand eye coordination	Double syllable sounds such as 'mama' and 'dada'; Babbles (consonant-vowel combinations)	Localises sound 45 cm (18 in) lateral to either ear; Visual acuity adult-like (20/20); Sensitivity to pictorial depth cues (those used by artists to indicate depth) emerges	May show stranger anxiety
9–10 months	Wiggles and crawls; Sits unsupported; Picks up objects with pincer grasp	Babbles tunefully	Looks for toys dropped	Apprehensive about strangers
1 year	Stands holding furniture; Stands alone for a second or two, then collapses with a bump	Babbles 2 or 3 words repeatedly	Drops toys, and watches where they go	Cooperates with dressing; Waves goodbye; Understands simple commands
18 months	Can walk alone; Picks up a toy without falling over; Gets up/down stairs holding onto rail; Begins to jump with both feet; Can build a tower of 3 or 4 cubes and throw a ball; Supinate grasping position is usually seen as the first grasping position utilized.	'Jargon': Many intelligible words	Be able to recognize their favourite songs, and will try to join in.	Demands constant mothering; Drinks from a cup with both hands; Feeds self with a spoon
2 years	Able to run; Walks up and down stairs using two footsteps per stair step; Builds a tower of 6 cubes	Joins 2–3 words in sentences; Able to repeat words that they hear.; Gradually build their vocabulary.	Able to recognize words	Parallel play; Daytime bladder control
3 years	Goes upstairs one footstep per stair step and downstairs two footsteps per stair step; Copies circle, imitates hand motions and draws man on request; Builds tower of 9 cubes; Pronate method of grasping develops	Constantly asks questions; Speaks in sentences		Cooperative play; Undresses with assistance; Imaginary companions
4 years	Goes both up and down stairs using one footstep per stair step; Postural capacity needed to control balance in walking has not been attained yet; Skips on one foot; Imitates gate with cubes; Copies a cross; Between 4 and 6 years, the classic tripod grip develops and is more efficient.	Questioning at its height; Many infantile substitutions in speech		Dresses and undresses with assistance; Attends to own toilet needs
5 years	Skips on both feet and hops.; Begins to be able to control balance not attained at 3–4 years of age; Begins to be able to control gravitational forces in walking; Draws a stick figure and copies a hexagonal-based pyramid using graphing paper; Gives age	Fluent speech with few infantile substitutions in speech		Dresses and undresses alone
6 years	At this age, until age 7, the adult muscle activation pattern in walking is complete.; Leads to head control and trunk coordination while walking, by at least age 8.; Mechanical energy transfer exists; Copies a diamond; Knows right from left and number of fingers	Fluent speech		
7 years	Hand-eye coordination is well developed.; Has good balance.; Can execute simple gymnastic movements, such as somersaults.	Uses a vocabulary of several thousand words.; Demonstrates a longer attention span.; Uses serious, logical attention span.; Able to understand reasoning and make the right decisions.	Contingent upon the health of the child.	Desires to be perfect and is quite self-critical, Worries more, may have low self-confidence.; Tends to complain, has strong emotional reactions.
8 years	The child can tie their shoelaces.; The child can draw a diamond shape.; The child becomes increasingly skilled in hobbies, sports, and active play.	Have well-developed speech and use correct grammar most of the time.; Become interested in reading books.; Are still working on spelling and grammar in their written work.	Contingent upon the health of the child.	Show more independence from parents and family.; Start to think about the future.; Understand more about their place in the world.; Pay more attention to friendships and teamwork.

== Infancy ==
=== Newborn ===
Physical development

- Infants are usually born weighing between 5 pounds 8 ounces (2,500 g) and 8 pounds 13 ounces (4,000 g), but infants born prematurely often weigh less.
- Newborns typically lose 7–10% of their birth weight in the first few days, but they usually regain it within two weeks.
- During the first month, infants grow about 1 to 1.5 inches (2.5 to 3.8 cm) and gain weight at a rate of about 1 ounce (28 g) per day.
- Resting heart rate is generally between 70 and 190 beats per minute.

Motor development

- Moves in response to stimuli.
- Displays several infantile reflexes, including:
  - The rooting reflex, which causes the infant to suck when the nipple of a breast or bottle is placed in their mouth.
  - The Moro reflex, which causes the infant to throw out their arms and legs when startled.
  - The asymmetrical tonic neck reflex is triggered when the head is turned to one side, causing the infant's arm on that side to straighten and the opposite arm to bend.
  - The palmar grasp reflex, which causes the infant to grasp a finger placed in their palm and to curl their toes when the soles of their feet are touched.

Communication skills

- Turns head towards sounds and voices.
- Cries to communicate needs and stops crying when needs have been met.

Emotional development

- Soothed by touches and voices of parents.
- Able to self-soothe when upset.
- Is alert for periods of time.

Cognitive skills

- Follows faces when quiet and alert.
- Stares at bright objects placed in front of the face for a short period of time.

=== One month old ===
Physical development

- Typically grows between 1 and 1.5 inches (2.5 and 3.8 cm) and gains about 2 pounds (910 g).

Motor development

- Hands kept in tight fists.
- Equal movement of arms and legs on both sides.
- Able to briefly hold up head when in prone position.
- Arm thrusts are jerky.
- Brings hands close to eyes and mouth.
- Able to move head from side to side when prone.
- Head flops backward if not supported.
- Infantile reflexes are strong.

Communication skills

- Startles at loud noises.
- Able to make noises besides crying.

Social development

- Able to recognize voices of parents.

Emotional development

- Responds to parents' comforting when upset.
- Becomes alert upon hearing pleasant sounds.

Cognitive skills

- Stares at objects, particularly brightly colored ones, when placed in front of the face.
- Able to follow faces.

Sensory development

- Focuses on things about 8 to 12 inches (20 to 30 cm) away.
- Eyes wander and may cross.
- Prefers black and white and high-contrast patterns, but prefers the human face over any other pattern.
- Hearing is fully developed.
- Has a preference for sweet smells and dislikes bitter and acidic smells.
- Recognizes the scent of mother's milk.
- Enjoys soft and coarse sensations and does not like rough handling.

=== Two months old ===
Physical development

- Typically grows at a similar rate to the previous month, usually growing between 1 and 1.5 inches (2.5 and 3.8 cm) and gaining about 2 pounds (910 g).
- Resting heart rate is usually between 80 and 160 beats per minute, and it typically stays within that range until the infant is about one year old.

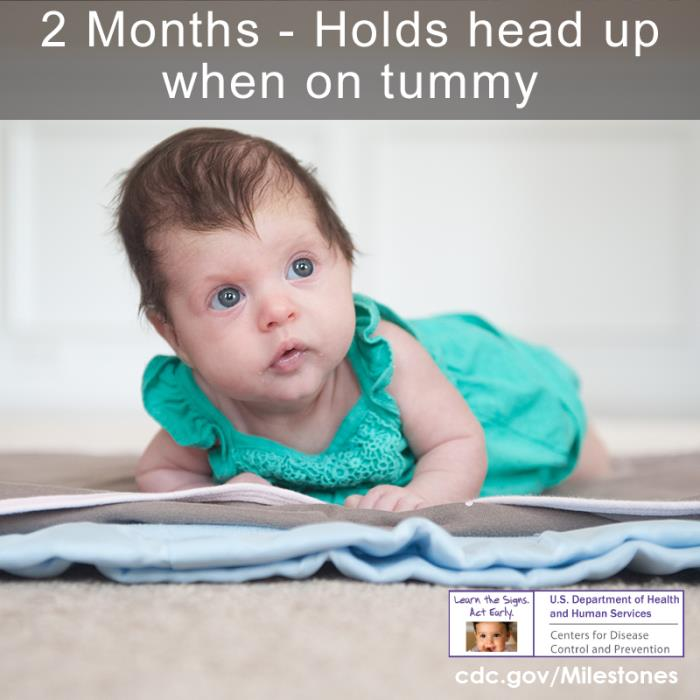

Motor development

- Can hold up head and chest while in prone position.
- Movements of arms and legs become smoother.
- Can hold head steady while in sitting position.
- Certain infantile reflexes, such as the Moro reflex and asymmetrical tonic neck reflex, begin to go away.
- Able to open and close hands.

Communication skills

- Able to coo and make gurgling noises.
- Able to turn the head towards noises.
- Begins to smile when interacted with.
- Pays attention to speaking people.

Social development

- Tries to look at parents.

Emotional development

- Able to briefly calm self by sucking on hands.
- Smiles when happy.

Cognitive skills

- Pays attention to faces.
- Follows objects with eyes.
- Capable of recognizing people from a distance.
- Starts becoming fussy when the activity does not change.

=== Three months old ===
Physical development

- Typically grows 1 to 1.5 inches (2.5 to 3.8 cm) and gains 1.5 to 2 pounds (680 to 910 g).

Social development

- Develops a social smile.
- Communicates and expresses more using face and body.

=== Four months old ===
Physical development

- By this age, infants may have doubled their birth weights. They typically grow about 0.8 inches (2.0 cm) and gain about 1 to 1.5 pounds (450 to 680 g) during this month. Fat rolls ("Baby Fat") begin to appear on thighs, upper arms, and neck.

Motor development

- May be able to roll from front to back.
- Starts to reach and grasp for objects.
- Brings hands and objects to mouth.
- Able to control head while sitting.
- Supports head and chest with arms while prone.
- Pushes on legs when feet are on a hard surface.
- Able to shake toys and swing at dangling objects.

Communication skills

- Able to smile, laugh, squeal, and blow bubbles.
- Coos in response to parents' coos.
- Turns towards voices.
- Uses different cries to communicate hunger, tiredness, and pain.

Social development

- Responds to affection.
- Begins to initiate social interaction by cooing or babbling.
- Smiles spontaneously at people.
- Enjoys playing with others.

Language development

- Starts to babble.
- Begins to mimic sounds.

Emotional development

- Smiles in response to events.
- Begins to imitate facial expressions.
- Able to soothe self.
- Becomes excited when approached by caregivers.

Cognitive skills

- Begins to easily get distracted by surroundings.
- Begins to predict and anticipate routines.
- Repeats behaviors that result in a desired effect.
- Grasps, mouths, and looks at toys.
- Lets caregivers know about mood.
- Able to reach for objects using one hand.
- Able to use hands and eyes together to accomplish tasks.
- Recognizes familiar things from a distance.

=== Six months old ===
Physical development

- Typically grows between 0.5 and 0.75 inches (1.3 and 1.9 cm) and gains between 1 and 1.25 pounds (450 and 570 g)

Motor development

- Able to push up to a crawling position and may be able to rock on knees.
- Able to sit with support.
- Able to stand with help and bounce while standing. An explorative study found, however, that 3- to 5-month-old infants can be taught independent standing, which was considered safe.
- Passes objects between hands.
- Some infantile reflexes, such as the palmar grasp reflex, go away.
- Grabs objects using a raking grasp, where fingers rake at objects to pick them up.
- Able to roll from both front to back and back to front.
- Rocks back and forth and may crawl backwards.

Communication skills

- Uses voice to get attention and to express emotions.
- Enjoys taking turns making sounds with parents.

Social development

- Is socially active.
- Smiles to attract attention and responds when interacted with.
- Able to tell if a person is a stranger.
- Enjoys playing with others, especially with parents.

Language development

- Able to blow raspberries and pronounce consonants such as "ba", "da", and "ga".
- Recognizes own name and understands a few other words.
- Makes sounds in response to sounds.
- Makes vowel noises, such as "ah", "eh", and "oh", while babbling.

Emotional development

- Recognizes familiar faces and responds happily to them.
- Startles at loud noises and may cry out of fear.
- Expresses happiness, pleasure, sadness, and anger.
- Responds to the emotions of others.
- Often seems to be happy.
- Likes to look at self in mirrors.

Cognitive skills

- Mouths objects to understand environment.
- Reaches for everything in view.
- Moves in the direction they wish to go.
- Understands where dropped objects fall.
- Looks at nearby objects.

=== Seven months old ===
Physical development

- Typically grows between 0.5 and 0.75 inches (1.3 and 1.9 cm) and gains between 1 and 1.25 pounds (450 and 570 g).

Motor development

- Begins to sit without support of hands.
- Able to support entire weight on legs.

Sensory development

- Able to see in full color.
- The ability to see at a distance and to track moving objects improves.

Language development

- Responds to "no".
- Able to tell emotions from tone of voice.

Cognitive skills

- Able to locate partially hidden objects.

=== 8–12 months ===
Physical

- Respiration rates vary with activity
- Environmental conditions, weather, activity, and clothing still affect variations in body temperature.
- Head and chest circumference remain equal.
- Anterior fontanelle begins to close.
- Continues to use abdominal muscles for breathing.
- More teeth appear, often in the order of two lower incisors then two upper incisors followed by four more incisors and two lower molars but some babies may still be waiting for their first.
- Arm and hands are more developed than feet and legs (cephalocaudal development); hands appear large in proportion to other body parts.
- Legs may continue to appear bowed.
- "Baby fat" continues to appear on thighs, upper arms and neck.
- Feet appear flat as the arch has not yet fully developed.
- Both eyes work in unison (true binocular coordination).
- Can see distant objects (4 to 6 m or 13 to 20 ft away) and points at them.

Motor development

- Reaches with one hand to grasp an offered object or toy.
- Adjustment from grip emerges around 8 months.
- Manipulates objects, transferring them from one hand to the other.
- Explores new objects by poking with one finger.
- They adjust their grip based on touch at 8 months, not yet visual cues.
- Infants will begin to use visual cues while reaching and grasping after 9 months of age.
- Uses deliberate pincer grasp to pick up small objects, toys, and finger foods.
- Stacks objects; also places objects inside one another.
- Releases objects or toys by dropping or throwing; cannot intentionally put an object down because infants, at eight months, are not using visual sensory information while grasping an object.
- Beginning to pull self to a standing position.
- Beginning to stand alone, leaning on furniture for support; moves around obstacles by side-stepping.
- Has good balance when sitting; can shift positions without falling.
- Creeps on hands and knees; crawls up and down stairs.
- The hip and knee joints exhibit a greater lag than the shoulder and elbow joints, which shows that motor skills develop in a cephalocaudal trend.
- The lags between joints decreases as age increases.
- The hip and knee joints are more strongly coupled than the shoulder and elbow joints in interlimb comparisons. This may be due to the weight bearing the hip and knee joints go through for standing and walking.
- Walks with adult support, holding onto adult's hand; may begin to walk alone.
- Walking alone leads to inconsistent steps, grasping objects for balance, and taking a few steps without falling.
- Walking usually occurs to explore the environment and not necessarily to obtain a specific task, goal, or object.
- Watches people, objects, and activities in the immediate environment.
- Responds to hearing tests (voice localization); however, loses interest quickly and, therefore, may be difficult to test formally.
- Recognizes objects in reverse
- Drops the thing intentionally and repeats and watches the object
- Imitates activities like playing a drum
- Begins to develop expressive rather than receptive language – child actually responding to what is said to them instead of only receiving and watching the interaction.

== Early childhood ==
=== Toddler (12–24 months) ===
Physical

- Weight is now approximately three times the child's birth weight.
- Respiration rate varies with emotional state and activity.
- Rate of growth slows.
- Head size increases slowly; grows approximately 1.3 cm (0.51 in) every six months; anterior fontanelle is nearly closed at eighteen months as bones of the skull thicken.
- Anterior fontanelle closing or fully closed, usually at the middle of this year.
- Chest circumference is larger than head circumference.
- Legs may still appear bowed.
- Toddler will begin to lose the "baby fat" once he/she begins walking.
- Body shape changes; takes on more adult-like appearance; still appears top-heavy; abdomen protrudes, back is swayed.

Motor development

- Crawls skilfully and quickly.
- Stands alone with feet spread apart, legs stiffened, and arms extended for support.
- Gets to feet unaided.
- Most children walk unassisted near the end of this period; falls often; not always able to maneuver around obstacles, such as furniture or toys.
- Children first recognize when to apply muscular force when walking in order to conserve energy; soon after, children learn to fine-tune muscle tissues to stabilize themselves.
- Uses furniture to lower self to floor; collapses backwards into a sitting position or falls forward on hands and then sits.
- Enjoys pushing or pulling toys while walking.
- Repeatedly picks up objects and throws them; direction becomes more deliberate.
- Attempts to run; has difficulty stopping and usually just drops to the floor.
- Crawls up stairs on all fours; goes down stairs in same position.
- Sits in a small chair.
- Carries toys from place to place.
- Enjoys crayons and markers for scribbling; uses whole-arm movement.
- Helps feed self; enjoys holding spoon (often upside down) and drinking from a glass or cup; not always accurate in getting utensils into mouth; frequent spills should be expected.
- Helps turn pages in book.
- Stacks two to six objects per day.

Cognitive development

- Enjoys object-hiding activities.
- Early in this period, the child always searches in the same location for a hidden object (if the child has watched the hiding of an object). Later, the child will search in several locations.
- Passes toy to other hand when offered a second object (referred to as "crossing the midline" – an important neurological development).
- Manages three to four objects by setting an object aside (on lap or floor) when presented with a new toy.
- Puts toys in mouth less often.
- Enjoys looking at picture books.
- Demonstrates understanding of functional relationships (objects that belong together): Puts spoon in bowl and then uses spoon as if eating; places teacup on saucer and sips from cup; tries to make doll stand up.
- Shows or offers toy to another person to look at.
- Names many everyday objects.
- Shows increasing understanding of spatial and form discrimination: puts all pegs in a pegboard; places three geometric shapes in large formboard or puzzle.
- Places several small items (blocks, clothespins, cereal pieces) in a container or bottle and then dumps them out.
- Tries to make mechanical objects work after watching someone else do so.
- Responds with some facial movement, but cannot truly imitate facial expression.
- Most children with autism are diagnosed at this age.

Language

- Produces considerable "jargon": puts words and sounds together into speech-like (inflected) patterns.
- Holophrastic speech: uses one word to convey an entire thought; meaning depends on the inflection ("me" may be used to request more cookies or a desire to feed self). Later, produces two-word phrases to express a complete thought (telegraphic speech): "More cookie", "Daddy bye-bye."
- Follows simple directions, "Give Daddy the cup."
- When asked, will point to familiar persons, animals, and toys.
- Identifies three body parts if someone names them: "Show me your nose (toe, ear)."
- Indicates a few desired objects and activities by name: "Bye-bye", "cookie"; verbal request is often accompanied by an insistent gesture.
- Responds to simple questions with "yes" or "no" and appropriate head movement.
- Speech is 25 to 50 percent intelligible during this period.
- Locates familiar objects on request (if child knows location of objects).
- Acquires and uses five to fifty words; typically these are words that refer to animals, food, and toys.
- Uses gestures, such as pointing or pulling, to direct adult attention.
- Enjoys rhymes and songs; tries to join in.
- Seems aware of reciprocal (back and forth) aspects of conversational exchanges; some turn-taking in other kinds of vocal exchanges, such as making and imitating sounds.

Social

- Less wary of strangers.
- Helps pick up and put away toys.
- Plays alone.
- Enjoys being held and read to.
- Often imitates adult actions in play.
- Enjoys adult attention; likes to know that an adult is near; gives hugs and kisses.
- Recognizes self in mirror.
- Enjoys the companionship of other children, but does not play cooperatively.
- Begins to assert independence; often refuses to cooperate with daily routines that once were enjoyable; resists getting dressed, putting on shoes, eating, taking a bath; wants to try doing things without help.
- May have a tantrum when things go wrong or if overly tired or frustrated.
- Exceedingly curious about people and surroundings; needs to be watched carefully to prevent them from getting into unsafe situations.

Walking development

- Young toddlers (12 months) have a wider midfoot than older toddlers (24 months).
- The foot will develop greater contact area during walking.
- Maximum force of the foot will increase.
- Peak pressure of the foot increases.
- Force-time integral increases in all except the midfoot.
- The lateral toes did not show a pattern in development of walking.
- Loading parameters of the foot generally increase, the midfoot develops opposite of the other regions in the foot.

=== Two-year-old ===
Physical

- Posture is more erect; abdomen still large and protruding, back swayed, because abdominal muscles are not yet fully developed.
- Respirations are slow and regular
- Body temperature continues to fluctuate with activity, emotional state, and environment.
- Brain reaches about 80 percent of its adult size.
- 16 baby teeth almost finished growing out

Motor development

- Can walk around obstacles and walk more erectly.
- Squats for long periods while playing.
- Climbs stairs unassisted (but not with alternating feet).
- Balances on one foot (for a few moments), jumps up and down, but may fall.
- Often achieves toilet training during this year (depending on child's physical and neurological development) although accidents should still be expected; the child will indicate readiness for toilet training.
- Throws large ball underhand without losing balance. Holds small cup or tumbler in one hand. Unbuttons large buttons; unzips large zippers.
- Opens doors by turning doorknobs.
- Grasps large crayon with fist; scribbles.
- Climbs up on chair, turns, and sits down.
- Stacks four to six objects on top of one another.
- Uses feet to propel wheeled riding toys.
- Most likely in the emerging stage of learning to run.

Cognitive

- Eye–hand movements better coordinated; can put objects together, take them apart; fit large pegs into pegboard.
- Begins to use objects for purposes other than intended (may push a block around as a boat).
- Does simple classification tasks based on single dimension (separates toy dinosaurs from toy cars).
- Seems fascinated by, or engrossed in, figuring out situations: where the tennis ball rolled, where the dog went, what caused a particular noise.
- Attends to self-selected activities for longer periods of time. Discovering cause and effect: squeezing the cat makes them scratch.
- Knows where familiar persons should be; notes their absence; finds a hidden object by looking in last hiding place first. (This is what Piaget termed object permanence, which usually occurs during the sensorimotor stage of Piaget's childhood theory of cognitive development)
- Names familiar objects.
- Recognizes, expresses, and locates pain.
- Expected to use "magical thinking", the causal relationships between actions and events.
- Tells about objects and events not immediately present (this is both a cognitive and linguistic advance).
- Expresses more curiosity about the world.

Language

- Enjoys participating while being read to.
- Realizes language is effective for getting desired responses.
- Uses 50 to 300 words; vocabulary continuously increasing.
- Has broken the linguistic code; in other words, much of a two-year-old's talk has meaning to them.
- Receptive language is more developed than expressive language; most two-year-olds understand significantly more than they can talk about.
- Utters three- and four-word statements; uses conventional word order to form more complete sentences.
- Refers to self as "me" or sometimes "I" rather than by name: "Me go bye-bye"; has no trouble verbalizing "mine".
- Expresses negative statements by tacking on a negative word such as "no" or "not": "Not more milk."
- Uses some plurals.
- Some stammerings and other dysfluencies are common.
- 65 to 70 percent of speech is intelligible.
- Is able to verbalize needs.
- Asks a lot of questions.

Social and emotional

- Shows signs of empathy and caring: comforts another child if hurt or frightened; appears to sometimes be overly affectionate in offering hugs and kisses to children
- Continues to use physical aggression if frustrated or angry (for some children, this is more exaggerated than for others); Physical aggression usually lessens as verbal skills improve.
- Temper tantrums likely to peak during this year; extremely difficult to reason with during a tantrum.
- Impatient; finds it difficult to wait or take turns.
- Enjoys "helping" with household chores; imitates everyday activities: may try to toilet train a stuffed animal, feed a doll.
- "Bossy" with parents and caregivers; orders them around, makes demands, expects immediate compliance from adults.
- Watches and imitates the play of other children, but seldom interacts directly; plays near others, often choosing similar toys and activities (parallel play); solitary play is often simple and repetitive.
- Offers toys to other children, but is usually possessive of playthings; still tends to hoard toys.
- Making choices is difficult; wants it both ways.
- Often defiant; shouting "no" becomes automatic.
- Ritualistic; wants everything "just so"; routines carried out exactly as before; belongings placed "where they belong".

=== Three-year-old ===
Physical

- Growth is steady though slower than in first two years.
- Adult height can be predicted from measurements of height at three years of age; males are approximately 53% of their adult height and females, 57%.
- Legs grow faster than arms.
- Circumference of head and chest is equal; head size is in better proportion to the body.
- "Baby fat" disappears as neck appears.
- Posture is more erect; abdomen no longer protrudes.
- Slightly knock-kneed.
- Can jump from low step
- Can stand up and walk around on tiptoes
- "Baby" teeth stage over.
- Needs to consume approximately 6,300 kJ (1,500 kcal) daily.

Motor development

- Walks up and down stairs unassisted, using alternating feet; may jump from bottom step, landing on both feet.
- Can momentarily balance on one foot.
- Can kick big ball-shaped objects.
- Needs minimal assistance eating.
- Jumps on the spot.
- Can walk unassisted.
- Bends over without falling.
- Climbs objects well.
- Starts to run easily, with knee flexion being used to support body weight.
- Full control of feet in running movement
- Pedals a small tricycle.
- Throws a ball overhand; aim and distance are limited.
- Catches a large bounced ball with both arms extended.
- Enjoys swinging on a swing.
- Shows improved control of crayons or markers; uses vertical, horizontal and circular strokes.
- Holds crayon or marker between first two fingers and thumb (tripod grasp), not in a fist as earlier.
- Can turn pages of a book one at a time
- Enjoys building with blocks.
- Builds a tower of eight or more blocks.
- Enjoys playing with clay; pounds, rolls, and squeezes it.
- May begin to show hand dominance.
- Carries a container of liquid, such as a cup of milk or bowl of water, without much spilling; pours liquid from pitcher into another container.
- Manipulates large buttons and zippers on clothing.
- Washes and dries hands; brushes own teeth, but not thoroughly.
- Usually achieves complete bladder control during this time.

Cognitive development

- Listens attentively to age-appropriate stories.
- Makes relevant comments during stories, especially those that relate to home and family events.
- Likes to look at books and may pretend to "read" to others or explain pictures.
- Enjoys stories with riddles, guessing, and "suspense".
- Speech is understandable most of the time.
- Produces expanded noun phrases: "big, brown dog".
- Produces verbs with "ing" endings; uses "-s" to indicate more than one; often puts "-s" on already pluralized forms: geeses, mices.
- Indicates negatives by inserting "no" or "not" before a simple noun or verb phrase: "Not baby."
- Answers "What are you doing?", "What is this?", and "Where?" questions dealing with familiar objects and events.

=== Four-year-old ===
Physical development

- Head circumference is usually not measured after age three.
- Requires approximately 7,100 kJ (1,700 kcal) daily.
- Hearing acuity can be assessed by child's correct usage of sounds and language, and also by the child's appropriate responses to questions and instructions.

Motor development

- Walks a straight line (tape or chalk line on the floor).
- Hops on one foot.
- Pedals and steers a wheeled toy with confidence; turns corners, avoids obstacles and oncoming "traffic".
- Climbs ladders, trees, playground equipment.
- Jumps over objects 12 to 15 cm (5 to 6 in) high; lands with both feet together.
- Runs, starts, stops, and moves around obstacles with ease.
- Uses arm movement to increase running speed
- Throws a ball overhand; distance and aim improving.
- Builds a tower with ten or more blocks.
- Forms shapes and objects out of clay: cookies, snakes and other simple animals.
- Reproduces some shapes and letters.
- Holds a crayon or marker using a tripod grasp.
- Paints and draws with purpose; may have an idea in mind, but often has problems implementing it so calls the creation something else.
- Becomes more accurate at hitting nails and pegs with hammer.
- Threads small wooden beads on a string.
- Can run in a circle.
- Can jump.

Cognitive

- Can recognize that certain words sound similar
- Names eighteen to twenty uppercase letters. Writes several letters and sometimes their name.
- A few children are beginning to read simple books, such as alphabet books with only a few words per page and many pictures.
- Likes stories about how things grow and how things operate.
- Delights in wordplay, creating silly language.
- Understands the concepts of "tallest", "biggest", "same", and "more"; selects the picture that has the "most houses" or the "biggest dogs".
- Rote counts to 20 or more.
- Understands the sequence of daily events: "When we get up in the morning, we get dressed, have breakfast, brush our teeth, and go to school."
- When looking at pictures, can recognize and identify missing puzzle parts (of person, car, animal).
- Very good storytellers.
- Counts 1 to 7 objects out loud, but not always in order
- Follows two to three step directions given individually or in a group
- May use the "-ed" ending improperly; for example: "I goed outside."

Language

- Uses the prepositions "on", "in", and "under".
- Uses possessives consistently: "hers", "theirs", "baby's".
- Answers "Whose?", "Who?", "Why?", and "How many?"
- Produces elaborate sentence structures: "The cat ran under the house before I could see what color it was."
- Speech is almost entirely intelligible.
- Begins to use the past tense of verbs correctly: "Mommy closed the door", "Daddy went to work."
- Refers to activities, events, objects, and people that are not present.
- Changes tone of voice and sentence structure to adapt to listener's level of understanding: To baby brother, "Milk gone?" To Mother, "Did the baby drink all of his milk?"
- States first and last name, gender, siblings' names, and sometimes own telephone number.
- Answers appropriately when asked what to do if tired, cold, or hungry. Recites and sings simple songs and rhymes.

Social development

- Outgoing; friendly; overly enthusiastic at times.
- Moods change rapidly and unpredictably; laughing one minute, crying the next; may throw tantrum over minor frustrations (a block structure that will not balance); sulk over being left out.
- Imaginary playmates or companions are common; holds conversations and shares strong emotions with this invisible friend.
- Boasts, exaggerates, and "bends" the truth with made-up stories or claims of boldness; tests the limits with "bathroom" talk.
- Cooperates with others; participates in group activities.
- Shows pride in accomplishments; seeks frequent adult approval.
- Often appears selfish; not always able to take turns or to understand taking turns under some conditions; tattles on other children.
- Insists on trying to do things independently, but may get so frustrated as to verge on tantrums when problems arise: paint that drips, paper airplane that will not fold right.
- Enjoys role-playing and make-believe activities.
- Relies (most of the time) on verbal rather than physical aggression; may yell angrily rather than hit to make a point; threatens: "You can't come to my birthday party."
- Name-calling and taunting are often used as ways of excluding other children.
- Can be bossy at times, telling their parents to stop talking, or telling their friends to "Come here right now."
- Establishes close relationships with playmates; beginning to have "best" friends.
- Begins to ask questions about own and others' bodies
- May attempt to see others naked in the bathroom

== Middle childhood ==
=== Five-year-old ===
Physical

- Head size is approximately that of an adult's.
- May begin to lose "baby" (deciduous) teeth.
- Body is adult-like in proportion.
- Requires approximately 7,500 kJ (1,800 kcal) daily
- Visual tracking and binocular vision are well developed.

Motor development

- Walks backwards, toe to heel.
- Walks unassisted up and down stairs, alternating feet.
- May learn to turn somersaults (should be taught the right way in order to avoid injury).
- Can touch toes without flexing knees.
- Walks a balance beam.
- Learns to skip using alternative feet.
- Catches a ball thrown from 1 m (3.3 ft) away.
- Rides a tricycle or wheeled toy with speed and skilful steering; some children learning to ride bicycles, usually with training wheels.
- Jumps or hops forward ten times in a row without falling.
- Balances on either foot with good control for ten seconds.
- Builds three-dimensional structures with small cubes by copying from a picture or model.
- Reproduces many shapes and letters: square, triangle, A, I, O, U, C, H, L, T.
- Demonstrates fair control of pencil or marker; may begin to colour within the lines.
- Cuts on the line with scissors (not perfectly).
- Hand dominance is fairly well established

Cognitive

- Forms rectangle from two triangular cuts.
- Builds steps with set of small blocks.
- Understands concept of same shape, same size.
- Sorts objects on the basis of two dimensions, such as colour and form.
- Sorts a variety of objects so that all things in the group have a single common feature (classification skill: all are food items or boats or animals).
- Understands the concepts of smallest and shortest; places objects in order from shortest to tallest, smallest to largest.
- Identifies objects with specified serial position: first, second, last.
- Rote counts to 20 and above; many children count to 100.
- Recognizes numerals from 1 to 10.
- Understands the concepts of less than: "Which bowl has less water?"
- Understands the terms dark, light, and early: "I got up early, before anyone else. It was still dark."
- Relates clock time to daily schedule: "Time to turn on the TV when the little hand points to 5."
- Some children can tell time on the hour: five o'clock, two o'clock.
- Knows what a calendar is for.
- Recognizes and identifies coins; beginning to count and save money.
- Many children know the alphabet and names of upper- and lowercase letters.
- Understands the concept of half; can say how many pieces an object has when it has been cut in half.
- Asks innumerable questions: Why? What? Where? When? How? Who?
- Eager to learn new things. Curious and inquisitive.

Language development

- Vocabulary of 1,500 words plus.
- Tells a familiar story while looking at pictures in a book.
- Defines simple words by function: a ball is to bounce; a bed is to sleep in.
- Identifies and names four to eight colours.
- Recognizes the humour in simple jokes; makes up jokes and riddles.
- Produces sentences with five to seven words; much longer sentences are not unusual.
- States the name of own city or town, birthday, and parents' names.
- Answers telephone appropriately; calls person to phone or takes a brief message
- Speech is almost entirely grammatically correct.
- Uses "would" and "could" appropriately.
- Uses past tense of irregular verbs consistently: "went", "caught", "swam."
- Uses past-tense inflection (-ed) appropriately to mark regular verbs: "jumped", "rained", "washed".

Social development

- Enjoys and often has one or two focus friendships.
- Plays cooperatively (can lapse), is generous, takes turns, shares toys.
- Participates in group play and shared activities with other children; suggests imaginative and elaborate play ideas.
- Shows affection and caring towards others especially those "below" them or in pain
- Generally subservient to parent or caregiver requests.
- Needs comfort and reassurance from adults but is less open to comfort.
- Has better self-control over swings of emotions.
- Likes entertaining people and making them laugh.
- Enjoys conversing with other people.
- Boasts about accomplishments.
- Often has an imaginary friend

=== Six-year-old ===
Physical

- Weight gains reflect significant increases in muscle mass.
- Heart rate and respiratory rates are close to adults.
- Body may appear lanky as through period of rapid growth.
- Baby teeth beginning to be replaced by permanent ones, starting with the two lower front teeth
- 20/20 eyesight; if below 20/40 should see a professional.
- The most common vision problem during middle childhood is myopia, or near-sightedness.
- Uses 6,700 to 7,100 kJ (1,600 to 1,700 kcal) a day.

Motor development

- Gains greater control over large and fine motor skills; movements are more precise and deliberate, though some clumsiness persists.
- Enjoys vigorous running, jumping, climbing, and throwing etc.
- Has trouble staying still.
- Span of attention increases; works at tasks for longer periods of time.
- Can concentrate effort but not always consistently.
- Understands time (today, tomorrow, yesterday) and simple motion (some things go faster than others).
- Recognizes seasons and major activities done at certain times.
- Has fun with problem solving and sorting activities like stacking, puzzles, and mazes
- Enjoys the challenge of puzzles, counting and sorting activities, paper-and-pencil mazes, and games that involve matching letters and words with pictures.
- Recognizes some words by sight; attempts to sound out words
- In some cases the child may be reading well.
- Functioning which facilitates learning to ride a bicycle, swim, swing a bat, or kick a ball.
- Enjoys making things.
- Reverses or confuses certain letters: b/d, p/g, g/q, t/f.
- Able to trace objects.
- Folds and cuts paper into simple shapes.
- Can tie laces, string (like shoes).

Language

- Can identify right and left hands fairly consistently.
- Holds onto positive beliefs involving the unexplainable (magic or fantasy)
- Arrives at some understanding about death and dying; expresses fear that parents may die.
- Talks a lot.
- Loves telling jokes and riddles; often, the humour is far from subtle.
- In some cases, may use profanity sometimes.
- Enthusiastic and inquisitive about surroundings and everyday events.
- Able to carry on adult-like conversations; asks many questions.
- Learns 5 to 10 words a day; vocabulary of 10,000–14,000.
- Uses appropriate verb tenses, word order, and sentence structure.

Social and emotional

- Uses language rather than tantrums or physical aggression to express displeasure: "That's mine! Give it back, you dummy."
- Talks self through steps required in simple problem-solving situations (though the "logic" may be unclear to adults).
- Has mood swings towards primary caregiver depending on the day
- Friendship with parent is less depended on but still needs closeness and nurturing.
- Anxious to please; needs and seeks adult approval, reassurance, and praise; may complain excessively about minor hurts to gain more attention.
- Often cannot view the world from another's point of view
- Self-perceived failure can make the child easily disappointed and frustrated.
- Cannot handle things not going their own way
- Does not understand ethical behaviour or moral standards especially when doing things that have not been given rules
- Understands when he or she has been thought to be "bad"; values are based on others' enforced values.
- May be increasingly fearful of the unknown like things in the dark, noises, and animals.

=== Seven-year-old ===
Motor development

- Well-developed hand-eye coordination
- Good sense of balance
- Capable of basic gymnastics moves such as somersaults

Writing grips

- The dynamic tripod grip is the final stage of holding writing implements

Language

- Vocabulary now numbers at least a few thousand words
- Capable of telling time
- Begins to understand how sounds form words

Social and emotional

- Highly self-critical and eager to please
- Can understand right and wrong
- Increased ability at problem solving and reasoning
- Can feel shame and guilt
- Complains a lot and has strong emotional swings
- Occasionally has meltdowns over minor frustrations, mainly for attention
- Ability to deal with mistakes and failure improves
- Beginning of sexual attraction to/interest in peers
- Explore genitalia with other children their age. This occurrence typically begins with children "playing doctor" or who say "show me yours and I'll show mine." The event is the child showing interest in "naughty parts" which are perceived as forbidden
- Reluctant to undress in front of others and wish to have more privacy from parents

=== Eight-year-old ===
Motor development

- Has good finger control
- Increased physical strength and endurance
- Almost able to converse at an adult level
- Wants to understand how and why things work
- Clear, logical thinking skills
- Exhibits a clear preference for certain subjects and activities

Language skills

- Enjoys reading
- Can start to understand how opposites work
- Can now speak clearly

Social and emotional

- Starts to develop a close circle of same-sex friends
- Becomes more susceptible to peer pressure
- Enjoys group activities
- Prone to mood swings and melodramatics
- Extremely impatient and may have a hard time waiting for special events

== Preteen/late childhood years ==
=== Nine-year-old ===
Motor skills

- Quite good at handling tools
- Manual dexterity and hand-eye coordination are well-developed
- Capable of drawing in detail
- May persist with a particular physical activity to the point of exhaustion

Language skills

- Good at memorizing and recalling information, but typically does not show a deep understanding of it
- Capable of concentrating and resuming a task after an interruption
- Eager to learn skills
- Starts to understand right vs wrong in place of good vs bad

Social skills

- Often displays an intense revulsion of the opposite sex
- Will use physical complaints as a means of getting out of undesired tasks
- Generally dependable and can be trusted with basic responsibilities
- Prone to wide mood swings

=== Ten-year-old ===
Motor skills

- Capable of demanding motor/endurance tasks like bicycling and team sports
- Girls may begin puberty, starting with breast development and followed by a change in facial shape
- Adult-like motor planning
- Motor planning includes an individual's choice of movements and trajectory of such movements. Children begin to display motor planning in preference of certain body parts such as hand preference. For instance, left-handed children will start to plan how they can perform a motor skill, like throwing a ball, but execute it with their left hand. The preferred hand selection of children would also be displayed in other motor tasks.
- Children show significant increase in sensitivity to end-state comfort (ESC)
- ESC is the preference to initially use unusual uncomfortable postures and movements to end in a comfortable position. One common method of studying end-state comfort is the task of over-turned glass. In this task, individuals are asked to use one hand to pick up a drinking glass that is placed up-side down, turn it upright, and pour water from a given cup into the glass. Once the children begins to grab the upside-down glass with thumb pointing down, then they have displayed end-state comfort. As a result, once they have turned over the glass, the child would have ended with palm holding the glass in a comfortable position.
- The number of grips conforming to ESC strongly increased with age.

Language skills

- Still does not display a deep understanding of subjects
- Does not yet fully understand right from wrong
- Not yet good at organizing or planning things in a practical way

Social skills

- Some sexual attraction to/interest in peers
- Not as moody as 7- to 9-year-olds; overall disposition tends to be cheerful and fun-oriented
- Friendships are highly important, with friends usually of the same sex. This is not consistent to every individual, nor important overall
- Can have a short temper, but has learned to adjust anger levels according to the appropriateness of the situation
- Gets along well with parents, eager to please
- Has fewer fears than at younger ages

=== Eleven-year-old ===
Motor skills

- Extremely jumpy and has a hard time sitting still
- Girls typically begin growth of pubic hair; most boys either haven't begun puberty or it isn't obvious yet
- Rapid height gains
- Better ability at making decisions
- Begins to understand that not everyone holds the same beliefs
- Early acne is common in girls

Language skills

- Able to use logic and debate others quite well
- School reports may combine visual, oral, and written material

Social and emotional development

- Often critical of others, stubborn, and egotistical
- Tends to display anger physically by hitting people/objects, throwing things, or slamming doors
- Friends are important, but with more arguments than before
- May be worrisome and afraid of things
- Caring about what others think is more common

== Adolescence ==
=== Twelve years old ===
==== Motor skills ====
Girls are developing breasts, filled out pubic hair, underarm hair, and may begin menstruation.

Changes in boys less dramatic, but enlargement of the testicles and penis typically occurs along with the growth of fine pubic hair and frequent, random erections. Their voice may begin to change as well.

==== Language skills ====
Capable of categorizing information to make better sense of it. Reads adult books and magazines on subjects of interest. Capable of proofreading homework for spelling, grammar, and logic.

==== Social skills ====
Overall disposition is pleasant and upbeat. Can become extremely excited over subjects of interest or accomplishments. Strongly prone to peer pressure and following trends. More stable friendships with fewer melodramatics than at 11. May begin to have sexual attraction to/interest in peers.

=== Thirteen years old ===
- Menstruation in girls is common
- Growth spurts, ejaculations and voice changes are common in boys, as well as "peach fuzz", small strands of facial hair above their lip along with fine underarm hair
- Moody and uncomfortable with themselves and their surroundings
- Likes to be alone and values privacy
- May believe the world is out to get them
- Insecure about their bodies
- May not get along well with adults

=== Fourteen years old ===
- Boys may begin growth of fine facial hair
- Often a high interest in extracurricular activities
- May want to please and be popular
- Has a large circle of friends of both sexes

=== Fifteen years old ===
- Typically argumentative and unwilling to share their problems with others
- May want to be independent and free of their family
- Typically gets along better with siblings than parents
- Friendships are highly important
- Romantic interests are common.
- In some jurisdictions, many teenagers at this age are starting to drive with a learner's permit, allowing them to drive with someone else in the car.

=== Sixteen years old ===
- Boys typically begin to grow thick facial hair
- Good overall relationship with family
- Begins to see parents as human beings instead of authority figures
- Friendships highly important, may have a wide circle of friends of both sexes
- Many teenagers at this age are starting to drive on their own.
- Many teenagers at this age get their first jobs.

=== Seventeen years old ===
- Most teens have reached sexual maturity
- Sexual intercourse is more common
- Romantic interests are more common
- Love interests can be intense

== See also ==
- Attachment in children
- Attachment theory
- Behavioral cusp
- Child development
- The Connected Baby (documentary)
- Developmental differences in solitary facial expressions
- Early childhood
- Early childhood education
- Erikson's stages of psychosocial development
- Infant visual development
- Sign language in infants and toddlers
