= Cluster feeding =

Breastfeeding pattern

Cluster feeding refers to a pattern of breastfeeding where an infant feeds frequently in short intervals over a period of time, often during the evening or late afternoon. This phenomenon is a common behavior in newborns and young infants and is often associated with growth spurts, developmental milestones, and the body's adjustment to the demands of breastfeeding. However, cluster feeding without such reasons may also be a sign of issues such as delayed lactogenesis, low milk production, or an improper latch.
