= Myerson's sign =

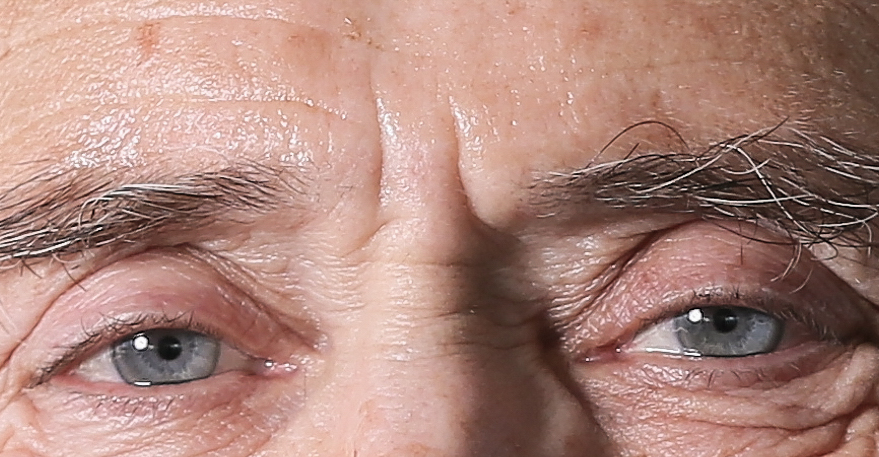
- Image showing the glabellar lines (the vertical creases between the eyes) which are over the area known as the glabella, where a patient is tapped to evoke the diagnostic sign
- Differential diagnosis: Parkinson's disease

Myerson's sign or glabellar tap sign is a clinical physical examination finding in which a patient is unable to resist blinking when tapped repetitively on the glabella, the area above the nose and between the eyebrows. It is often referred to as the glabellar reflex. It is often an early symptom of Parkinson's disease, but can also be seen in early dementia as well as other progressive neurologic illness. It is named for Abraham Myerson, an American neurologist.
