= HIV-associated neurocognitive disorder =

HIV-associated neurocognitive disorders
- Other names: AIDS dementia complex (ADC), Brain AIDS, HIV dementia, HIV-associated dementia (HAD), HIV encephalopathy
- Specialty: Infectious disease, neurology
- Symptoms: Memory and attention disorder, confusion, slowed thinking, ataxia, bradykinesia, apathy, depression, hallucinations, delusions, seizures, fatigue, paranoia, alexithymia
- Complications: dementia, aspiration pneumonia, injuries from falls, opportunistic infections or cancers, suicide, coma
- Prognosis: fatal without early treatment

HIV-associated neurocognitive disorders (HAND) are neurological disorders associated with HIV infection and AIDS. It is a syndrome of progressive deterioration of memory, cognition, behavior, and motor function in HIV-infected individuals during the late stages of the disease, when immunodeficiency is severe. HAND may include neurological disorders of various severity. HIV-associated neurocognitive disorders are associated with a metabolic encephalopathy induced by HIV infection and fueled by immune activation of macrophages and microglia. These cells are actively infected with HIV and secrete neurotoxins of both host and viral origin. The essential features of HIV-associated dementia (HAD) are disabling cognitive impairment accompanied by motor dysfunction, speech problems and behavioral change. Cognitive impairment is characterised by mental slowness, trouble with memory and poor concentration. Motor symptoms include a loss of fine motor control leading to clumsiness, poor balance and tremors. Behavioral changes may include apathy, lethargy and diminished emotional responses and spontaneity. Histopathologically, it is identified by the infiltration of monocytes and macrophages into the central nervous system (CNS), gliosis, pallor of myelin sheaths, abnormalities of dendritic processes and neuronal loss.

HAD typically occurs after years of HIV infection and is associated with low CD4+ T cell levels and high plasma viral loads. It is sometimes seen as the first sign of the onset of AIDS. Prevalence is between 10 and 24% in Western countries and has only been seen in 1–2% of India-based infections. With the advent of highly active antiretroviral therapy (HAART), the incidence of HAD has declined in developed countries, although its prevalence is increasing. HAART may prevent or delay the onset of HAD in people with HIV infection, and may also improve mental function in people who already have HAD.

Dementia only exists when neurocognitive impairment in the patient is severe enough to interfere markedly with day-to-day function. That is, the patient is typically unable to work and may not be able to take care of themselves. Before this, the patient is said to have a mild neurocognitive disorder.

== Presentation ==
Cognitive impairments associated with HIV occur in the domains of attention, memory, verbal fluency, and visuospatial construction. Specifically for memory, the lowered activity of the hippocampus changes the basis for memory encoding and affects mechanisms such as long-term potentiation. Severity of impairment in different domains varies depending on whether or not a patient is being treated with HAART or monotherapy. Studies have shown that patients exhibit cognitive deficits consistent with dysfunction of fronto-striatal circuits including associated parietal areas, the latter of which may account for observed deficits in visuospatial function. In addition to cognitive impairments, psychological dysfunction is also noted. For example, patients with HIV have higher rates of clinical depression and alexithymia, i.e., difficulty processing or recognizing one's own emotions. Patients also have more difficulty recognizing facial emotions.

Without combination antiretroviral therapy, cognitive impairments increase with successive stages of HIV. HIV patients in early stages show mild difficulties in concentration and attention. In advanced cases of HIV-associated dementia, speech delay, motor dysfunction, and impaired thought and behavior are observed. Specifically, lower motor speeds were found to correlate with hypertrophy of the right putamen.

The diagnosis of HIV-associated neurocognitive impairment is made using clinical criteria after considering and ruling out other possible causes. The severity of neurocognitive impairment is associated with nadir CD4, suggesting that earlier treatment to prevent immunosuppression due to HIV may help prevent HIV-associated neurocognitive disorders.

== Pathophysiology ==
HIV-associated dementia (HAD) is not a true opportunistic infection; it is one of the few conditions caused directly by HIV itself. However, the cause of HAD can be difficult to discern because the central nervous system can be damaged by a number of other causes related to HIV infection:

- opportunistic infections
- AIDS-related lymphoma or metastasis of other AIDS-related cancers
- direct effects of HIV in the brain
- toxic effects of drug treatments
- malnutrition

Many researchers believe that HIV damages the vital brain cells, neurons, indirectly. According to one theory, HIV either infects or activates cells that protect the brain, known as macrophages and microglia. These cells then produce toxins that can set off a series of reactions that instruct neurons to self-destruct. The infected macrophages and microglia also appear to produce additional factors such as chemokines and cytokines that can affect neurons as well as other brain cells known as astrocytes. The affected astrocytes, which normally nurture and protect neurons, also may now end up harming neurons. Astrocytes produce neurotoxic proteins such as Tat, Nef and Rev. Tat is secreted and induces reactivity in astrocytes through increased GFAP expression. HIV protein gp120 inhibits the stem cells in the brain from producing new nerve cells. In the neuronal cells, the HIV gp120 induces mitochondrial-death proteins like caspases, which may influence the upregulation of the death receptor Fas leading to apoptosis.

=== Direct effects of HIV ===
HIV enters the brain early on in the infection. It is thought that HIV uses a "Trojan horse" mechanism to enter the brain. Normally, the blood–brain barrier (BBB) serves as a protective mechanism by preventing entry of foreign substances; disruption of the BBB by HIV contributes to the progression of infection. The virus is able to enter the brain through infected cells that pass through the BBB to replace the immune cells surrounding the blood supply in the brain. When infected, immune cells are able to better migrate into tissues compared to uninfected cells. Infected microglia add to the production of the virus. This activation of the microglia may contribute to the process of neuropathogenesis that spreads the infection to nearby cells. Other cells that can get infected include the astrocytes, which can trigger bystander cellular dysfunction and apoptosis, further compromising the blood–brain barrier. The toxicity spreads through a gap junction-dependent mechanism.

==== Brain regions affected ====
HIV is associated with pathological changes in mainly subcortical and fronto-striatal areas of the brain, including the basal ganglia, deep white matter, and hippocampal regions. Neuroimaging studies of HIV patients indicate that significant volume reductions are apparent in the frontal white matter, whereas subcortically, hypertrophy is apparent in the basal ganglia, especially the putamen. Moreover, the results of some studies suggest loss of brain volume in cortical and subcortical regions even in asymptomatic HIV patients and patients who were on stable treatment. A recent longitudinal study of a small representative cohort of HIV-positive patients on stable medication regiments suggests that this cortical atrophy is progressive, and is in part related to nadir CD4. Cerebral brain volume is associated with factors related to duration of the disease and CD4 nadir; patients with a longer history of chronic HIV and higher CD4 nadir loss present with greater cerebral atrophy. CD4 lymphocyte counts have also been related to greater rates of brain tissue loss. Current factors, such as plasma HIV RNA, have been found to be associated with brain volumes as well, especially with regards to basal ganglia volume and total white matter. Loss of cortical grey matter oligodendrocytes and neurons might also contribute to the symptomatology.

Changes in the brain may be ongoing but asymptomatic, that is with minimal interference in functioning, making it difficult to diagnose HIV-associated neurocognitive disorders in the early stages.

== Diagnostic criteria ==
1. Marked acquired impairment of at least two ability domains of cognitive function (e.g. memory, attention): typically, the impairment is in multiple domains, especially in learning, information processing and concentration/attention. The cognitive impairment is ascertained by medical history, mental status examination or neuropsychological testing.
2. Cognitive impairments identified in 1 interfere markedly with day-to-day functioning.
3. Cognitive impairments identified in 1 are present for at least one month.
4. Cognitive impairments identified in 1 do not meet the criteria for delirium, or if delirium is present, dementia was diagnosed when delirium was not present.
5. No evidence of another, pre-existing cause that could explain the dementia (e.g. another CNS infection, CNS neoplasm, cerebrovascular disease, pre-existing neurological disease, severe substance abuse compatible with CNS disorder.

While the progression of dysfunction is variable, it is regarded as a serious complication and untreated can progress to a fatal outcome. Diagnosis is made by neurologists who carefully rule out alternative diagnoses. This routinely requires a careful neurological examination, brain scans (MRI or CT scan) and a lumbar puncture to evaluate the cerebrospinal fluid. No single test is available to confirm the diagnosis, but the constellation of history, laboratory findings and examination can reliably establish the diagnosis when performed by experienced clinicians. The amount of virus in the brain does not correlate well with the degree of dementia, suggesting that secondary mechanisms are also important in the manifestation of HAD.

=== HAD stage characteristics ===
- Stage 0 (Normal) Normal Mental and Motor Function
- Stage 0.5 (Subclinical) Minimal symptoms of cognitive or motor dysfunction characteristic of HAD, or mild signs (snout response, slowed extremity movements), but without impairment of work or capacity to perform activities of daily living (ADL). Gait and strength are normal.
- Stage 1 (Mild) Evidence of functional intellectual or motor impairment characteristic of HAD, but able to perform all but the more demanding aspects of work or ADL. Can walk without assistance.
- Stage 2 (Moderate) Cannot work or maintain the more demanding aspects of daily life, but able to perform basic activities of self care. Ambulatory, but may require a single prop.
- Stage 3 (Severe) Major intellectual incapacity: cannot follow news or personal events, cannot sustain complex conversation, considerable slowing of all output; and/or motor disability: cannot walk unassisted, requiring walker or personal support, usually with slowing and clumsiness of arms as well.
- Stage 4 (End Stage) Nearly vegetative. Intellectual and social comprehension and responses are at a rudimentary level. Nearly or absolutely mute. Paraparetic or paraplegic with urinary incontinence and fecal incontinence.

=== Neuroimaging studies ===
A study by Melrose et al. (2008) examined the integrity of the fronto-striatal circuitry that underlies executive functioning in HIV. Participants in the study were diagnosed with HIV three months to sixteen years before the study. Ten out of eleven patients were on antiretroviral medication and none scored within the demented range on the HIV Dementia Scale. It was found that HIV+ patients showed less activity within the ventral prefrontal cortex (PFC) and left dorsolateral PFC. There was reduced connectivity between the left caudate and ventral PFC and between the left caudate and dorsolateral PFC compared to healthy controls. Additionally, there was hypoactivation of the left caudate in the HIV+ patients. In the control group, there was correlation between caudate activity and executive functioning as shown by performance on neuropsychological testing. Further analysis of the pathways in the HIV+ group involving left caudate showed reduced functional connectivity between the left caudate and globus pallidus (basal ganglia output nucleus). This dysfunction with the basal ganglia and PFC may explain the executive function and semantic event sequencing task impairments noted in HIV+ patients included in this study.

The study by Melrose et al. (2008) also investigated parietal activation. It was found that anterior parietal activation in HIV+ patients was slightly anterior to that in control participants, which follows the idea that HIV causes a reorganization of the attention network leading to cognitive impairments. Additionally, the anterior parietal activity showed a relationship with caudate functioning, which implicates a compensatory mechanism set forth when damage to the fronto-striatal system occurs.

Overall, the study by Melrose et al. (2008) showed that HIV in the brain is associated with cognitive impairments. Damage to the fronto-striatal system may underlie cognitive problems including executive function and sequencing tasks.

Another area of impairment due to fronto-striatal dysfunction is in the area of emotion recognition. In a study of HIV+ patients and control adults by Clark et al. (2010), it was shown that HIV patients demonstrate impairments in the recognition of fearful facial expressions. The authors suggested that fronto-striatal abnormalities related to HIV may underlie these impairments.

In identification tasks, administered by Clark et al. (2010), HIV+ patients and control participants were asked to identify different facial emotions and landscapes, with these picture categories matched for image complexity. HIV+ patients did worse than the control group on the facial recognition task but not on landscape identification. In the facial emotion task, fear recognition was significantly worse in the HIV than in the control group.

== Neurodevelopmental disorders associated with infection ==
Mother-to-child transmission during pregnancy is the dominant mode of acquisition of HIV infection in children and has been associated with an increased risk of mortality and developmental delay. Children with AIDS appear to have neurological diseases as a consequence of HIV-1 infection. In HIV-1 infected newborn and children, central nervous system (CNS) is infected with HIV-1 weeks after primary infection, causing neuronal damage and cell death. Although neurological dysfunctions have been associated to HIV infection of the CNS, it is unclear how the pathogenesis of neurological disorders has been established.

The main cells infected by HIV-1 in the nervous tissue are the microglia, astrocytes and macrophages, whereas infected neurons have been rarely observed. The susceptibility to HIV-1 infection and replication in neuronal and glial cells is a function of cellular differentiation, and it is more likely in immature precursors than with differentiated cells. Several soluble signals, such as cytokines, have been described to modulate susceptibility and can further contribute in supporting virus latency or virus replication during organ development. In fact, within the developing CNS, cells are under the control of environmental factors that provide instructive signals to neural cell targets. By regulating the survival, differentiation and maintenance of specific functions of neuronal and glial precursors, these extracellular signals can influence many steps of the CNS development and concur in controlling virus-cell interactions in the maturing brain.

In addition to the production of cytokines, HIV-1 infected mononuclear cells and astrocytes can produce a number of soluble mediators, including viral proteins such as gp120 and Tat, that can exert damaging effects on both developing and mature neural tissues. Moreover, molecules such as the platelet activating factor (PAF) and prostaglandins, which are produced upon microglia/macrophages and astrocytes functional interactions, have been reported to mediate cell damage in primary neural cell cultures and neural cell lines with immature phenotype.

Taken together, these observations suggest that the mechanism by which the virus can alter CNS development and induce pathology in the immature brain may depend upon the altered production of soluble bioactive compounds. Several potentially neurotoxic mediators have been identified in different model systems, including inflammatory cytokines, viral proteins and neurotoxic metabolites. Thus, it is likely that a complex interaction of several mediators may alter the function and survival of actively developing and maturing cells, responsible for the neurologic disorders.
