= Primitive reflexes =

Reflex actions in infants

Primitive reflexes are reflex actions originating in the central nervous system that are exhibited by normal infants, but not neurologically intact adults, in response to particular stimuli. These reflexes are suppressed by the development of the frontal lobes as a child transitions normally into child development. These primitive reflexes are also called infantile, infant or newborn reflexes.

Older children and adults with atypical neurology (e.g., people with cerebral palsy) may retain these reflexes and primitive reflexes may reappear in adults. Reappearance may be attributed to certain neurological conditions including dementia (especially in a rare set of diseases called frontotemporal degenerations), traumatic lesions, and strokes. An individual with cerebral palsy and typical intelligence can learn to suppress these reflexes, but the reflex might resurface under certain conditions (i.e., during extreme startle reaction). Reflexes may also be limited to those areas affected by the atypical neurology, (i.e., individuals with cerebral palsy that only affects their legs retaining the Babinski reflex but having normal speech); for those individuals with hemiplegia, the reflex may be seen in the foot on the affected side only.

Primitive reflexes are primarily tested with suspected brain injury or some dementias such as Parkinson's disease for the purpose of assessing frontal lobe functioning. If they are not being suppressed properly they are called frontal release signs. Atypical primitive reflexes are also being researched as potential early indicators of autistic spectrum disorders.

Primitive reflexes are mediated by extrapyramidal functions, many of which are already present at birth. They are lost as the pyramidal tracts gain functionality with progressive myelination. They may reappear in adults or children with loss of function of the pyramidal system due to a variety of reasons. However, with the advent of Amiel Tison method of neurological assessment, the importance of assessment of such reflexes in the pediatric population has come down.

== Adaptive value of reflexes ==
Reflexes vary in utility. Some reflexes hold a survival value (e.g., the rooting reflex, which helps a breastfed infant find the mother's nipple). Babies display the rooting reflex only when they are hungry and touched by another person, not when they touch themselves. There are a few reflexes that likely assisted in the survival of babies during human evolutionary past (e.g., the Moro reflex). Other reflexes such as sucking and grabbing help establish gratifying interaction between parents and infants. They can encourage a parent to respond with love and affection, and to feed their child more competently. In addition, it helps parents to comfort their infant while allowing the baby to control distress and the amount of stimulation they receive.

== Sucking reflex ==
The sucking reflex is common to all mammals and is present at birth(gestational age of appearance 32 to 36 weeks). It is linked with the rooting reflex and breastfeeding. It causes the child to instinctively suck anything that touches the roof of their mouth and simulates the way a child naturally eats. There are two stages of the action:

1. Expression: activated when the nipple is placed between a child's lips and touches their palate. They will instinctively press it between their tongue and palate to draw out the milk.
2. Milking: The tongue moves from areola to nipple, coaxing milk from the mother to be swallowed by the child.

== Rooting reflex ==
The rooting reflex is present at birth (gestational age of appearance 28 weeks) and disappears around four months of age, as it gradually comes under voluntary control. The rooting reflex assists in the act of breastfeeding. A newborn infant will turn its head toward anything that strokes its cheek or mouth, searching for the object by moving its head in steadily decreasing arcs until the object is found. After becoming familiar to responding in this way (if breastfed, approximately three weeks after birth), the infant will move directly to the object without searching.

== Moro reflex ==
The Moro reflex in a four-day-old infant: 1) the reflex is initiated by pulling the infant up from the floor and then releasing him; 2) he spreads his arms 3) he pulls his arms in; 4) he cries (11 seconds)

The Moro reflex is an important indicator for evaluating integration of the central nervous system, named after its discoverer, pediatrician Ernst Moro. Although this is sometimes referred to as the startle reaction, startle response, startle reflex or embrace reflex, most researchers see it as distinct from the startle reflex, and it is believed to be the only unlearned fear in human newborns.

The Moro reflex is present at birth, peaks in the first month of life, and begins to integrate around 2 months of age. It is likely to occur if the infant's head suddenly shifts position, the temperature changes abruptly, or they are startled by a sudden noise. The legs and head extend while the arms jerk up and out with the palms up and thumbs flexed. Shortly afterward the arms are brought together and the hands clench into fists, and the infant cries loudly.

The reflex normally integrates by three to four months of age, though it may last up to six months. Bilateral absence of the reflex may be linked to damage to the infant's central nervous system, while a unilateral absence could mean an injury due to birth trauma (e.g., a fractured clavicle or injury to the brachial plexus). Erb's palsy or some other form of paralysis is also sometimes present in such cases. In human evolutionary history, the Moro reflex may have helped infants cling to the mother while being carried around. If the infant lost its balance, the reflex caused the infant to embrace its mother and regain its hold on the mother's body.

== Walking/stepping reflex ==
The walking or stepping reflex is present at birth, though infants this young cannot support their own weight. When the soles of their feet touch a flat surface they will attempt to walk by placing one foot in front of the other. This reflex integrates around 2 months as infants start attempting to walk after this reflex disappears.

== Asymmetrical tonic neck reflex (ATNR) ==
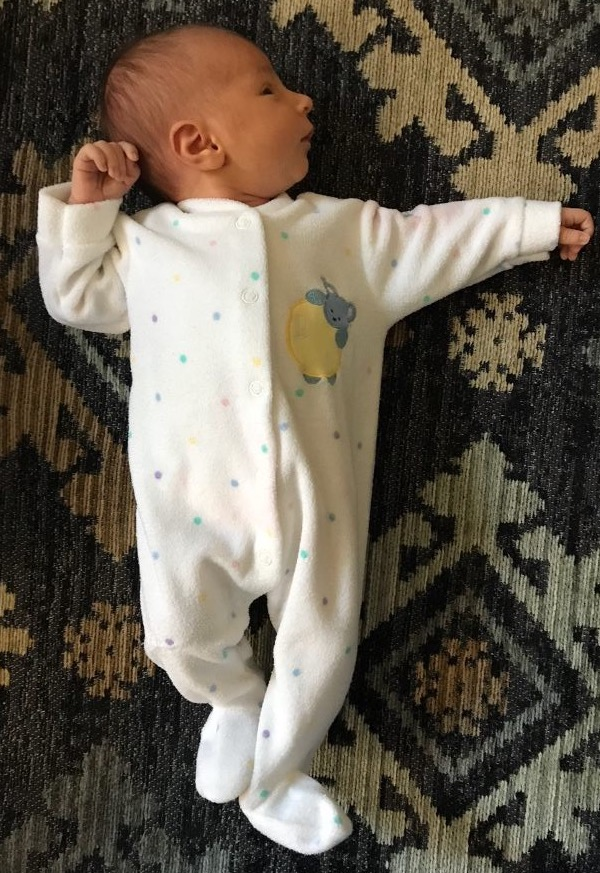
The asymmetrical tonic neck reflex (ATNR) in a two-week-old infant, with extension of the left limbs and flexion of the right ones

The asymmetrical tonic neck reflex, also known as 'fencing posture', is present at one month of age and integrates at around four months. When the child's head is turned to the side, the arm on that side will straighten and the opposite arm will bend (sometimes the motion will be very subtle or slight). If the infant is unable to move out of this position or the reflex continues to be triggered past six months of age, the child may have a disorder of the upper motor neurons. According to Laura Berk, the tonic neck reflex is a precursor to the hand/eye coordination of the infant. It also prepares the infant for voluntary reaching.

== Symmetrical tonic neck reflex ==
The symmetric tonic neck reflex normally appears and develops around 6–9 months of age and should integrate by around 12 months. When the child's head flexes forward, extending the back of the neck, the upper extremities will contract and the lower extremities will extend. Conversely, when the child's head is extended backward, contracting the back of the neck, the upper extremities will extend and the lower extremities will contract. This reflex is important to help a child push up onto their hands and knees but may inhibit actual forward creeping or crawling if it is not properly integrated. If this reflex is retained beyond 2–3 years, it may result, directly or indirectly, in a range of physical and neurological developmental delays.

== Tonic labyrinthine reflex ==
The tonic labyrinthine reflex is a primitive reflex found in newborn humans. With this reflex, tilting the head back while lying on the back causes the back to stiffen and even arch backwards, the legs to straighten, stiffen, and push together, the toes to point, the arms to bend at the elbows and wrists, and the hands to become fisted or the fingers to curl. The presence of this reflex beyond the newborn stage is also referred to as abnormal extension pattern or extensor tone.

The presence of the TLR as well as other primitive reflexes such as the asymmetrical tonic neck reflex (ATNR) beyond the first six months of life may indicate that the child has developmental delays and/or neurological abnormalities. For example, in people with cerebral palsy, the reflexes may persist and even be more pronounced. As abnormal reflexes, both the tonic labyrinthine reflex and the asymmetrical tonic neck reflex can cause problems for the growing child. The TLR and ATNR both hinder functional activities such as rolling, bringing the hands together, or even bringing the hands to the mouth. Over time, both the TLR and ATNR can cause serious damage to the growing child's joints and bones, causing the head of the femur to partially slip out of the acetabulum (subluxation) or completely move out of the acetabulum (dislocation).

== Palmar grasp reflex ==
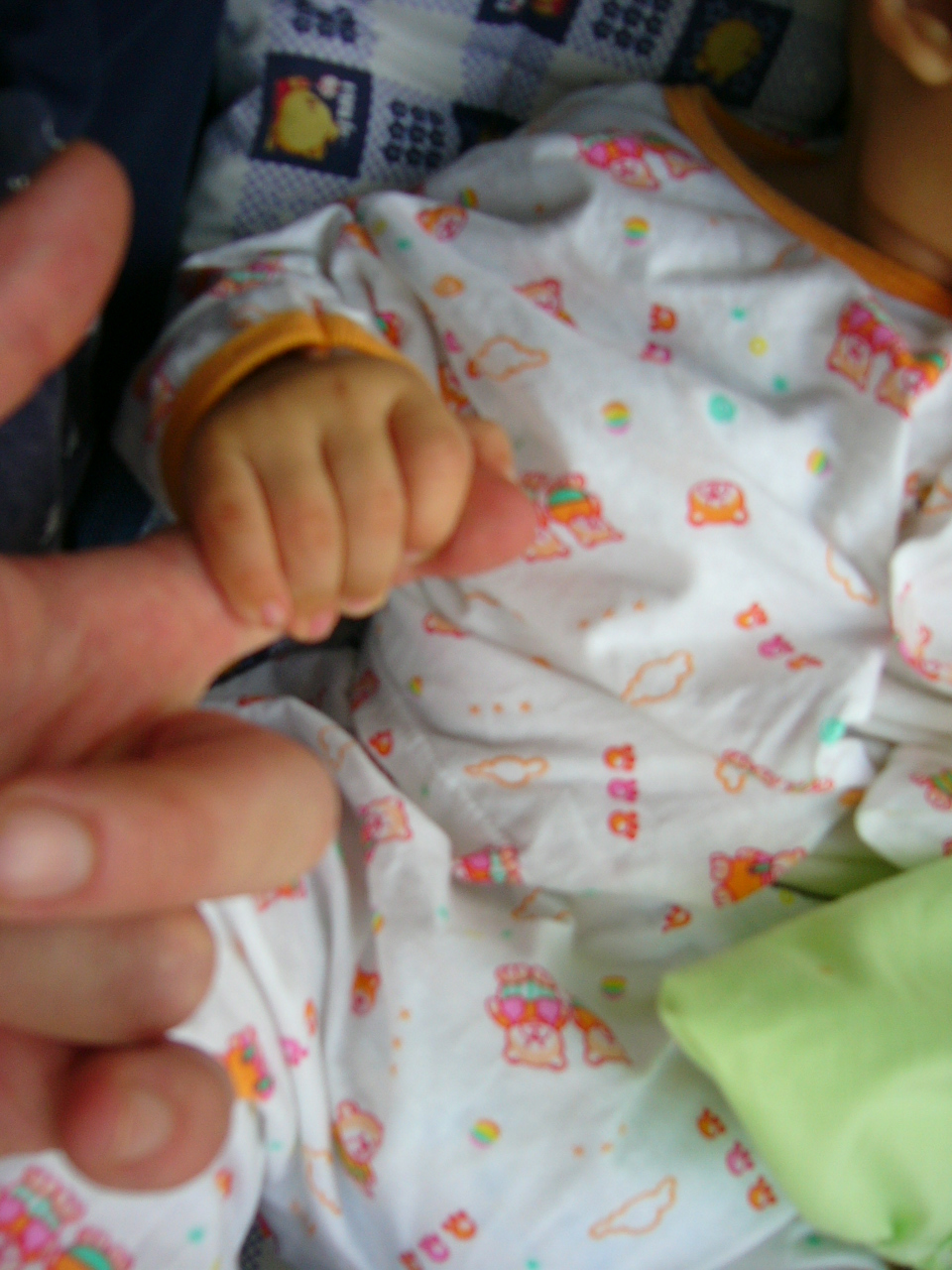
Grasp reflex of a 5 month old baby

The palmar grasp reflex appears at birth and persists until five or six months of age. When an object is placed in the infant's hand and strokes their palm, the fingers will close and they will grasp it with a palmar grasp. To best observe this reflex, on a bed where the child could safely fall onto a pillow, offer the infant two opposing little fingers (as index fingers are typically too large for the infant to grasp), and gradually lift. The grasp of it may be able to support the child's weight; they may also release their grip suddenly and without warning. The reverse motion can be induced by stroking the back or side of the hand.

== Plantar reflex ==
A plantar reflex is a normal reflex that involves plantar flexion of the foot, which moves toes away from the shin and curls them down. An abnormal plantar reflex (Babinski sign) occurs when upper motor neuron control over the flexion reflex circuit is interrupted. This results in a dorsiflexion of the foot (foot angles towards the shin, big toe curls up). This also occurs in babies under c. 1 year, because of low myelination of the corticospinal tracts. As these tracts develop to adult form, the flexion-reflex circuit is inhibited by the descending corticospinal inputs, and the normal plantar reflex develops. The Babinski reflex is a sign of neurological abnormality (e.g., upper motor neuron lesion) in adults.

== Galant reflex ==
The Galant reflex, also known as Galant's infantile reflex, is present at birth and fades between the ages of four and six months. When the skin along the side of an infant's back is stroked, the infant will swing towards the side that was stroked. If the reflex persists past six months of age, it is a sign of pathology. The reflex is named after the Russian neurologist Johann Susman Galant.

== Swimming reflex ==
The swimming reflex involves placing an infant face down in a pool of water. The infant will begin to paddle and kick in a swimming motion. The reflex disappears between 4 and 6 months. Despite the infant displaying a normal response by paddling and kicking, placing them in water can be a very risky procedure. Infants can swallow a large amount of water while performing this task; therefore, caregivers should proceed with caution. It is advisable to postpone swimming lessons for infants until they are at least three months old because infants submerged in water can die from water intoxication.

== Babkin reflex ==
An infant demonstrating the Babkin reflex: he opens his mouth when pressure is applied to both palms (8 seconds).

The Babkin reflex occurs in newborn babies, and describes varying responses to the application of pressure to both palms. Infants may display head flexion, head rotation, opening of the mouth, or a combination of these responses. Smaller, premature infants are more susceptible to the reflex, with an observed occurrence in a child of 26 weeks gestation. It is named after the Russian physiologist, Boris Babkin.

== Parachute reflex ==
This reflex occurs in slightly older infants (starts between 6 and 7 months and become fully mature by 1 year of age) when the child is held upright and the baby's body is rotated quickly to face forward (as in falling). The baby will extend their arms forward as if to break a fall, even though this reflex appears long before the baby walks. It never disappears.

== Unintegrated reflexes ==
Reflexes that are not suppressed in infancy are referred to as unintegrated or persistent reflexes. When they persist, they are related to academic struggles. For example, children with learning difficulties have been found to exhibit persistent primitive reflexes. In addition, a persistent ATNR has been found to be associated with lower reading and spelling scores, and children with reading problems tend to display the tonic labyrinthine reflex more than children without reading problems. Upon monitoring pre-primary school children to see how reflexes develop as an infant gets older, the strongest association of all motor skills was found between static and dynamic balance and performance in academic activities such as mathematics. There has also been a high correlation found between ATNR persistence and decreased fine motor skills in children, which in many cases has led to a diagnosis of motor deficit disorders such as Developmental Coordination Disorder (DCD). Lastly, a relationship has been found between ADHD symptoms and ATNR persistence and another between ADHD diagnosis and Moro and Galant reflex persistence.

== Reflex Integration ==
Reflex integration is a therapeutic approach designed to identify and integrate persistent primitive reflexes to promote neurological development. Primitive reflexes are automatic movement patterns that emerge during infancy and are typically inhibited by higher brain functions as the nervous system matures. If these reflexes persist beyond the expected age, they may interfere with motor development, learning, and behavior.

The therapy involves specific exercises and sensory stimulation aimed at reorganizing the nervous system to inhibit these persistent reflexes. The goal is to support neurological maturity, laying the foundation for more complex motor and cognitive skills.

Research has shown that retained primitive reflexes can be associated with learning and behavioral difficulties. For instance, the persistence of the asymmetric tonic neck reflex (ATNR) has been linked to challenges in reading and writing. Integrating such reflexes can improve academic performance and behavior in children.

Several methods are used in reflex integration therapy, including:

- The INPP® Method: Developed by the Institute for Neuro-Physiological Psychology, this method assesses and addresses neuromotor immaturity using tailored exercises to inhibit persistent reflexes.
- Rhythmic Movement Training International (RMTi): This approach employs rhythmic movements to support reflex integration, enhancing learning, behavior, and emotional regulation.
- Masgutova Neurosensorimotor Reflex Integration (MNRI): Focused on integrating primary motor reflex patterns, MNRI aims to support optimal neurological functioning.

While positive anecdotal reports and some studies support the efficacy of reflex integration therapy, scientific evidence remains limited. Further research is necessary to fully evaluate the long-term effects and effectiveness of these therapeutic approaches.

== Other primitive reflexes tested in adults ==
As mentioned in the introduction, when primitive reflexes are not being suppressed properly they are generally referred to as frontal release signs (although this may be a misnomer). In addition to the reflexes previously mentioned, they include the palmomental reflex, snout reflex, glabellar reflex or "tap" reflex.

== Primitive reflexes in high-risk newborns ==
The term high-risk newborns refers to neonates with a significant chance of mortality or morbidity, especially within the first month of being born. High-risk newborns will often show abnormal responses of primitive reflexes, or lack a response entirely. Performance of primitive reflexes in high-risk newborns will often vary in response depending on the reflex (e.g., normal Moro reflex may be present, while the walking reflex is absent or abnormal). Normal performance of primitive reflexes in newborns can be linked to a greater likelihood of having higher Apgar scores, higher birth weight, shorter hospitalization time after birth, and a better overall mental state.

A 2011 cross-sectional study assessing primitive reflexes in 67 high-risk newborns, used a sample method to evaluate responses of the sucking, Babinski and Moro reflexes. The results of the study showed that the sucking reflex was performed normally most often (63.5%), followed by the Babinski reflex (58.7%), and the Moro reflex (42.9%). The study concluded that high-risk newborns presented more periodic abnormal and absent responses of primitive reflexes, and that each reflex varied in response.

However, with the advent of simple and effective methods like the Amiel Tison method of neurological assessment, as predictor of neurological sequelae in high-risk neonates and infants, the importance of assessment of primitive reflexes is decreasing.

== See also ==
- Instinct
- Emotion
