= Stranger anxiety =

Form of distress that children feel when exposed to strangers

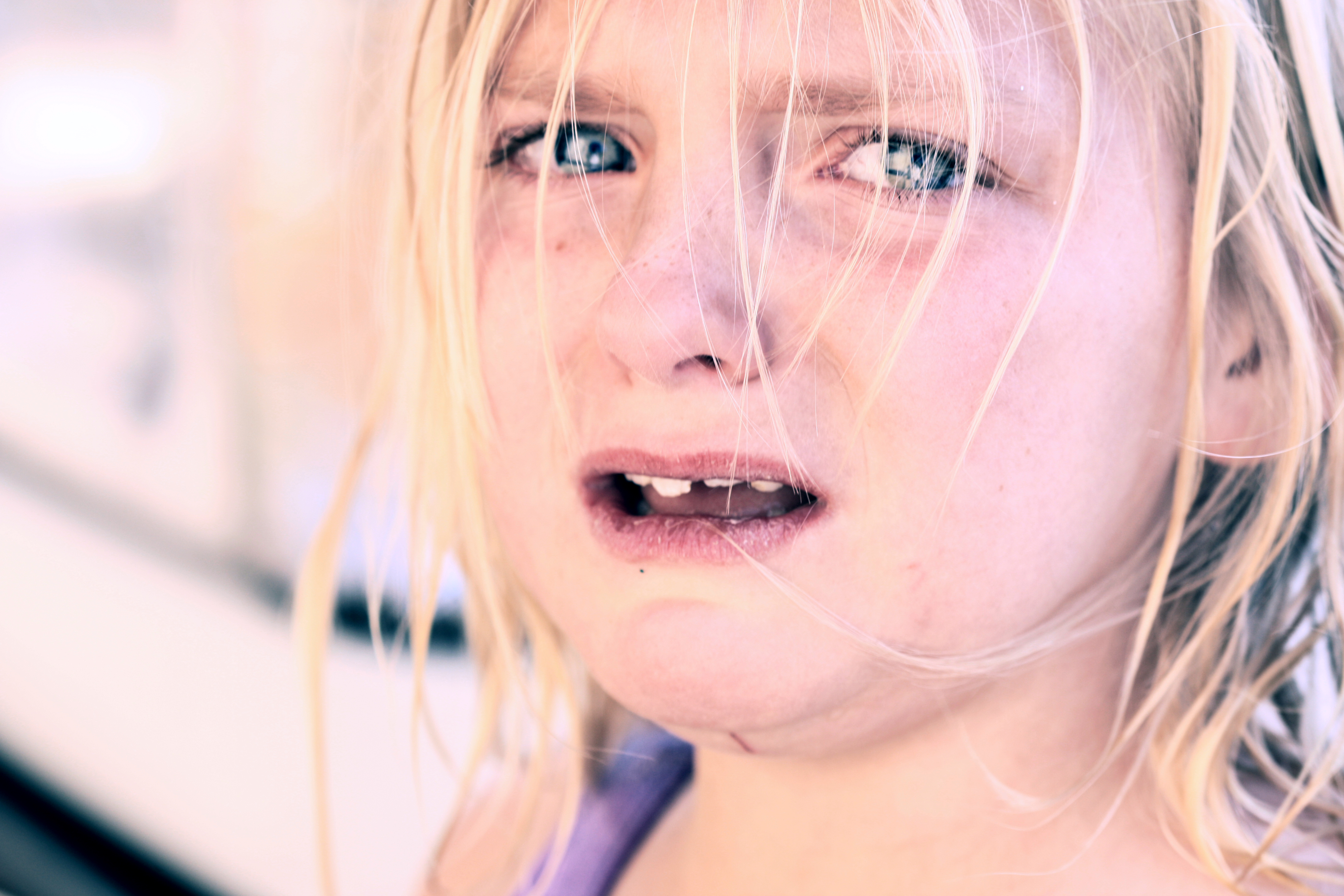
Crying is a common sign of anxiety in children

Stranger anxiety is a form of distress that children experience when exposed to strangers. Stranger anxiety and stranger fear are two interchangeable terms. Stranger anxiety is a typical part of the developmental sequence that most children experience. It can occur even if the child is with a caregiver or another person they trust. It peaks from six to 12 months but may recur afterwards until the age of 24 months. As a child gets older, stranger anxiety can be a problem as they begin to socialize. Children may become hesitant to play with unfamiliar children. Foster children are especially at risk, particularly if they experienced neglect early in their life.

The anxiety children experience when meeting a stranger is based on the sensation of fear they develop when introduced to an unfamiliar factor in their life that elicits the feeling of fear. They are not born with the awareness that meeting a stranger for the first time will cause them to be fearful. The child discovers this feeling when facing the stimulus, in this case a stranger, for the first time. Experiencing fear causes toddlers to sense they are in a potentially threatened position and therefore, they go towards their caregiver in order to seek protection from the stranger. This reaction enables children to develop instincts to guide them when they feel endangered and seek the protection of a familiar and trusted individual to ensure their safety and survival. The stimuli which provoke a child's anxiety in the presence of a stranger are influenced by the individual's age, gender and his or her distance from the toddler. When a child is in the company of an unknown child, they are less frightened than if they were with an unknown adult. This is due to the height of the individual. The taller the person, the more frightening they seem. In addition, children are more fearful of a stranger when they are standing in close proximity to them, while their caregiver is farther away or completely out of their sight. The gender of the stranger contributes to the level of anxiety a child experiences. When in the presence of a male, the child feels more anxious than in front of a female.

The anxiety a child feels when facing a stranger is based on various fears that arise in them. A few of these are based on the actions the stranger could unexpectedly take. For example, the child worries they can be taken away from their caregiver or harmed. The fear of the unknown elicits the anxiety. Although anxiety can go away in few minutes, it could also last a long time. As children reach the age of two, their feelings of anxiety in the presence of strangers are nearly gone. However, some children can still experience apprehension up until the age of four. It is less probable for toddlers to experience anxiety in the presence of a stranger if a figure they trust, such as their caregivers, perform positive interactions with this person. For example, they employ a calm tone of voice, they smile and hug the stranger. This enables the child to feel a certain reassurance seeing that their caregiver does not show any sign of fear in the presence of this individual.

== Onset ==
Stranger anxiety develops slowly; it does not just appear suddenly. It typically first starts to appear around four months of age with infants behaving differently with caregivers than with strangers. In fact, there is a difference between their interactions with their caregiver and the stranger. They become cautious when strangers are around; therefore, preferring to be with their caregiver instead of the stranger. Around 7–8 months, stranger anxiety becomes more present; therefore, it occurs more frequently at this point. Infants start to be aware of their environment and they are aware of their relationships with people; so, stranger anxiety is clearly displayed. Around this time, children choose and prefer to be with their primary caregiver. As a child's cognitive skills develop and improve, typically around 12 months, their stranger anxiety can become more intense. They display behaviors like running to their caregiver, grabbing at the caregiver's legs, or demanding to be picked up. Children seem also to respond more positively to a person who gives positive reinforcements and more negatively to a person who gives negative reinforcements.

Fearfulness within the sight of outsiders is thought to be developed around 6 months of age. In fact, that fear of strangers increases throughout their first year of life. The beginning of stranger fear is accepted to be adaptive, offering balance to infants' tendencies toward approach and exploration and adding to the developing attachment system. However, in extreme cases of stranger fear, this can be a warning sign to the emergence of social anxiety. According to the University of Pittsburgh, stranger anxiety tends to be seen before separation anxiety.

Infants may be afraid of strangers

=== Signs of stranger anxiety ===
According to the University of Pittsburgh, signs of stranger anxiety can differ from one child to the other, based on the child. For example;

1. In the presence of a stranger, some infants can abruptly go quiet and look at the stranger with fear.
2. In other children, certain emotional responses will increase while in the presence of a stranger such as loud crying and fussiness.
3. Others will have the tendency to bury themselves in their caregiver's arms or even place themselves away from the stranger by placing the caregiver between themselves and the stranger.

=== Modeling and stranger anxiety ===
==== Infancy ====
Parental attitudes also have an effect on a child's fear acquisition. In their early months and years, infants acquire most of their behavioral information from their direct family and often, their primary caregivers. Young infants are more selective and preferentially learn about new threats from their mother's responses. High risk mothers can easily influence their child's responses since the child is more likely to mimic their mother’s actions. For example, if a child sees their mother demonstrating negative reactions towards a specific person, then the child is more likely to have a negative response towards that same person. While most studies have researched the effect of mothers' behaviors on their children, the effect of parental modeling is not unique to mothers, but the phenomenon occurs for both mothers and fathers.

===== Implications =====
Fear beliefs that occur vicariously can be reversed using the same form of acquisition through a vicarious counter-conditioning procedure. For example, a parent can show a stranger's angry face with happy face or a scared-paired animal with happy faces as well and vice versa. Also, fear responses seem to decrease with time if infants are provided with opportunities to have physical contact with the stimuli which helps alleviate the stimuli's fearful properties.

==== Childhood ====
Stranger fear is less likely in older children (i.e. at least six years old) since there is a greater readiness for them to accept behavioral information from outside the family. However, studies show that when parents discuss new threats with older children, those children tend to become more anxious about them and more likely to avoid them.

The effect of parental modeling of anxiety on children may go beyond influencing anxious behaviors in children, but also affect their subjective feelings and cognition during middle childhood.

===== Implications =====
This has important implications for parents and those working with school-age children because it suggests that they can potentially prevent or reverse fear developing if they recognize a child is involved in a fear-related vicarious learning event. If an infant shows fear toward a stranger or unfamiliar object, parents should wait until after the child reacts fearfully, then respond calmly and positively toward the stranger — this helps reassure the child rather than preempting the fear before it happens.

== Dealing with stranger anxiety ==
Because stranger anxiety can appear suddenly or build up gradually as a toddler develops, it can be hard to handle — people are often caught off guard, either because they don’t know how to react or because they aren’t even aware that stranger anxiety is a normal thing. Stranger anxiety should be viewed as a normal, common part of a child's development. Since it is often characterized by negative emotions and fear, multiple steps were created to induce a feeling of trust and safety between the child and the strangers.

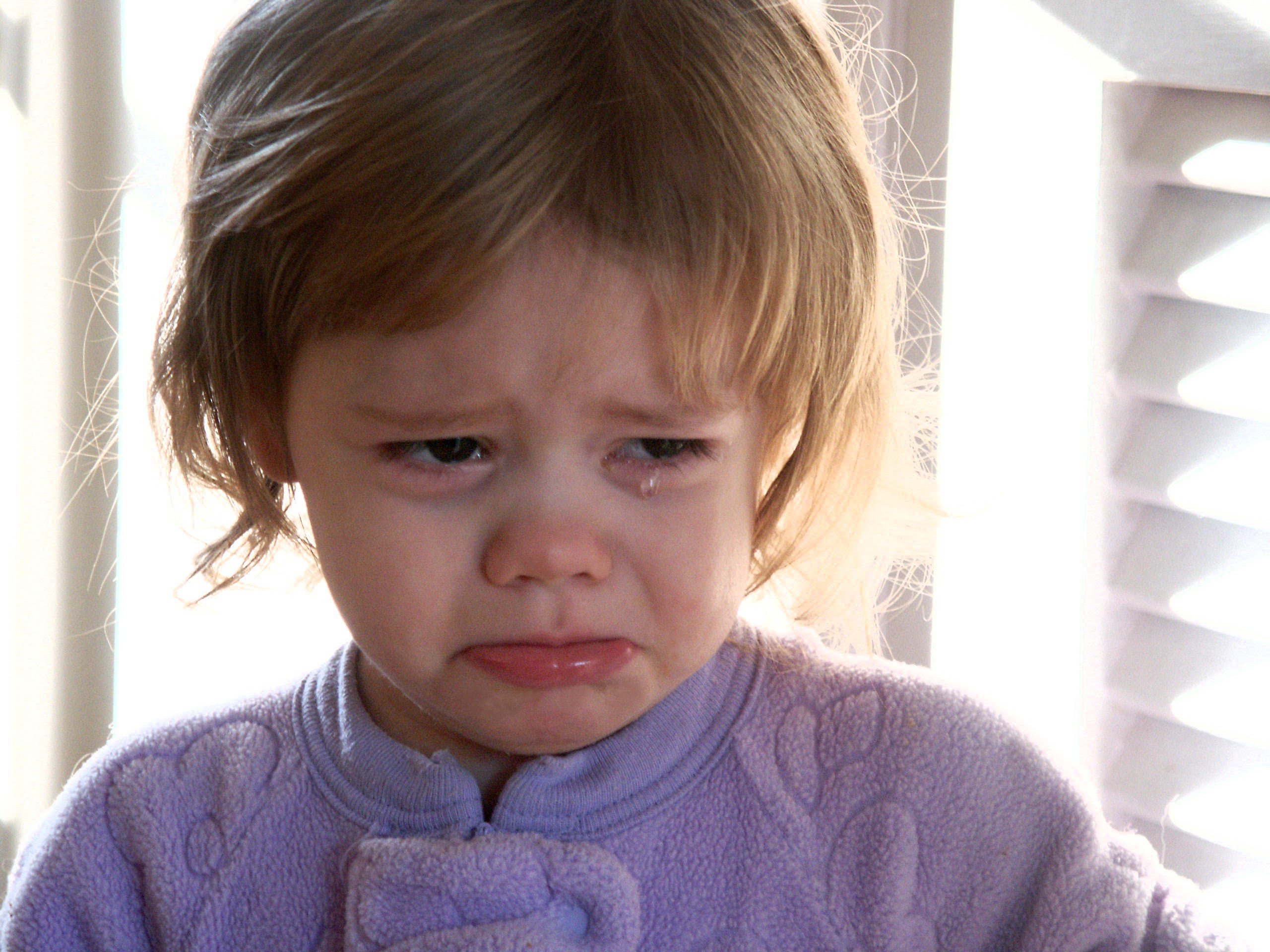
The child's feelings should always be valued

- Addressing the issue with the stranger ahead of time, so that they can learn to approach the child slowly, giving them time to warm up. The stranger should be informed of the child's fear, so they are not hurt when the child reacts negatively to them.
- Holding a child's hand when they are introduced to new people has been found to be a good way to create a feeling of trust between them and the stranger.
- Frequently introducing children to new people. Taking them to places where they might interact with strangers.
- Being patient when a fearful situation shows up will be crucial. If rushed, children can become even more sensitive.
- Gradually bringing new babysitters or child-care workers into the child's life.
- Showing understanding of the fears of children should be priority number one. Ignoring or dismissing these feelings will only aggravate the problem.
- Above all, the child's feelings should always be valued more than the strangers'. Patience and respect are very important when dealing with stranger anxiety. A child should never be labeled or ridiculed for being frightened.

Extreme anxiety can affect development, especially if a child is so terrified that they will not explore new environments and hinder themselves from learning. Also, research shows that exposure to circumstances that produce persistent fear and chronic anxiety can have a lifelong effect on a child's brain by disrupting its developing architecture. While stranger anxiety is a normal part of child development, if it becomes so severe that it restricts normal life professional help might be necessary. Seeking the help of a pediatrician is recommended if the situation doesn't improve, or even regresses over time. Often, pediatricians will be able to find the origin of the child's anxiety and create a plan of action in order to rectify the situation.

== Stranger anxiety and autism spectrum disorder ==
According to the American Psychiatric Association, autism spectrum disorder (ASD) is defined as "a developmental disorder characterized by troubles with social interaction and communication, and by restricted and repetitive behavior". There is a significant overlap between the behaviors that characterize ASD and those observed in stranger anxiety, which makes diagnoses and research more difficult. However, individuals with ASD often have a rigid understanding of the world and behave in a very rule-based and compartmentalized manner, depending on their placement on the spectrum. Thus, the social interactions and stranger approaches seen in children are often modeled from their caretakers and are based on the rules they are told.

=== Modelling in stranger anxiety in ASD ===
Children with developmentally appropriate behavior also model their parents' behavior and can exhibit stranger anxiety until they are about six years old, but children with ASD have difficulty accepting behavioral information and understanding how to behave with certain people and strangers. Thus, if caretakers/parents demonstrate negative behavior, like facial expressions, verbal communications, or physical retractions, towards strangers, children with autism will often imitate this behavior. Although children with ASD often have difficulty with imitation, children are often taught that strangers are "dangerous". Moreover, if caretakers teach children with autism that strangers are unsafe, they will demonstrate stranger anxiety and have difficulty understanding otherwise as they grow. For example, caretakers may teach children to never speak to strangers, but children with ASD will understand this literally and may fear and be anxious around all strangers.

=== Strategies ===
Therefore, it is crucial to appropriately teach children with autism who they may expect to meet in a given location and situation and what those people look like, in order for them to be self-sufficient and not anxious wherever they are. Individuals with ASD need to understand not only who they should be interacting with in the community, but also what the expected behaviors are during these interactions. Moreover, caretakers/parents are cautioned not to reinforce negative reactions when strangers are seen and to teach "stranger danger" precariously. Thus children with autism should be taught strategies that slightly differ from those for a developmentally appropriate child. One example of a strategy is the Circles Program, which color coordinates individuals that a child may encounter by titling them in different colored circles and outlining the expected social boundaries with these people. Another strategy used for children with ASD and stranger anxiety is to use social stories, this includes pictures and audio tapes which makes understanding possible changes they may encounter with strangers.

== Stranger terror ==
Child afraid of new women in classroom

Stranger terror is extremely severe stranger anxiety that inhibits the child's normal functioning. The DSM- V describes stranger terror as infants with a reactive attachment disorder, inhibited type and do not respond to or initiate contact with others, but rather show extreme trepidation and ambivalence about unknown adults. Anxiety and fear around strangers usually appears around six months of age and it slowly increases throughout the first year of life. This increase in stranger anxiety correlates with the same time as when the child starts crawling, walking and exploring its surroundings. The age of the child seems to play an important role in the development of stranger terror in infants. Older infants (i.e. at least 12 months) seem to be more affected than younger infants because their cognitive development to know and remember has matured more than younger infants and their attachment to caregivers is stronger than younger infants.

Stranger anxiety and stranger terror is associated with Attachment Theory, the attachment to the caregiver. Seen across different species, attachment increases the chances of the infant's survival in the world. In a research conducted by Tyrrell and Dozier (1997), they found that infants in foster care show more attachment-related difficulties than control infants in their families. Those foster children were sometimes unsoothable after the contact or even just the presence of a stranger. There have been hypotheses that for these infants the appearance of the stranger represented a potential loss of the new attachment figure and it was the fear of re-experiencing this loss that prompted their behavior. Those children with stranger anxiety will rarely go beyond their caregiver to explore their surroundings. Stranger terror elicits strong reactions from children as described below, most likely due to the degree of traumatic event which causes their strong reactions such as the loss of a mother. In order to cope with attachment-related traumas, children with stranger terror develop abnormal means of coping with these events by viewing all adults as threatening and avoiding contact with everyone, for example.

=== Strange situation ===
In a Strange Situation experiment, a child of the age of 20 months was in a room with their mother and a stranger would enter. The child would go hide behind the legs of the mother. The mother was then asked to leave the room and leave the child with the stranger. After the first separation, the child began to scream and was extremely upset. He refused all contact with the stranger and when the adult tried to pick up the child he would scream louder until put back down. Any attempts by the stranger to sooth the child was unsuccessful. When the mother came back in the room for the first reunion, the child somewhat calmed down, but he was still very upset and distressed. For the second part of the experiment, the child was left alone in the room for a couple of minutes before the stranger entered again. The second the stranger entered the room the child began crying loudly again even if no contact was made.

Although resistance to a stranger is common in children, the extreme reaction is far more urgent and indicates terror. In addition, most babies in the experiment show some evidence of settling when the stranger enters the room the second time. In contrast, children with stranger terror showed an increase in distress upon the stranger's entry.

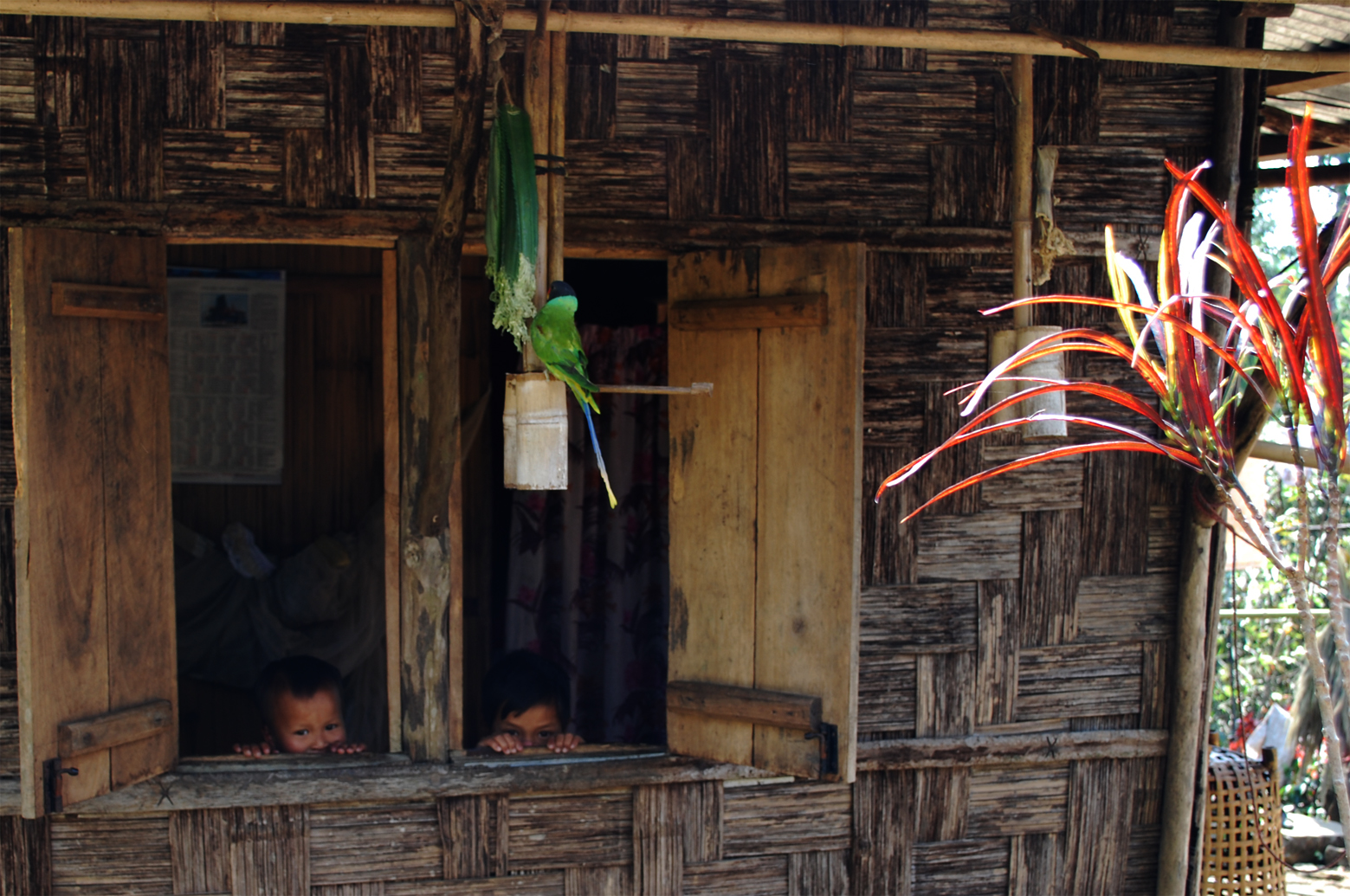
Children may hide when a stranger arrives at their home.

=== Some signs of stranger terror ===
- Fleeing when a person they don't know enters their home, even if they aren't interacting with the child.
- Worried facial expressions that are typically seen on an older child.
- Being very upset by a stranger's presence, even in the child's own home.
- Loud screaming or arching of the back when an unfamiliar person tries to comfort or hold the child.
- Being silent or wary for longer than normal periods with fearful facial expressions.

== See also ==
- Neophobia, a general persistent fear of new or novel stimuli
- Separation anxiety disorder
- Social phobia
- Social anxiety
