= Peter Moro =

London-based architect (1911–1998)

Peter Moro CBE FRIBA
- Born: 27 May 1911; Heidelberg, Germany
- Died: 10 October 1998 (aged 87)
- Education: Berlin-Charlottenburg
- Occupation: Architect
- Spouse: Anne Margaret Theodosia Vanneck (m. 1940; div. 1994)
- Parent(s): Ernst Moro and Margarete Königswald

Peter Meinhard Moro CBE FRIBA (27 May 1911 – 10 October 1998) was a London-based architect whose practice developed many notable public buildings. He was the son of Slovenian physician and paediatrician Ernst Moro.

== Life and works ==
Moro was born in Heidelberg, Germany, to Professor Ernst Moro, a renowned Slovenian physician and pediatrician, and Margarete Königswald.

He initially trained in Stuttgart and then at the Technische Hochschule in Berlin-Charlottenburg. Having a Jewish grandmother, he was obliged to move to Zurich for his final two years, studying under Otto Salvisberg.

On graduating in 1936, he moved to London, England, with no money and limited English. He worked for two years with Berthold Lubetkin, "by far the most interesting architect I ever worked with."

In 1938, Moro and Richard Llewelyn-Davies were commissioned to build a house, Harbour Meadow at Birdham, Sussex, one of the least known but most original modern houses of the 1930s, now Grade II listed.

Moro was briefly interned as an "enemy alien" from June to December 1940 at Huyton Camp outside Liverpool and then in Douglas Isle of Man. From 1941–47 taught at the Regent Street Polytechnic establishing a reputation as someone who knew how to teach architecture in a modern way. Students from his class were drafted into the design team for the Festival Hall. "I chose a handful of the best of my former students whose ideas of design were sympathetic to my own." He was made a RIBA Fellow in 1948.

From 1952 to 1984, he led Peter Moro and Partners, designing Fairlawn Primary School, Lewisham in 1957. His design for his own house at 20, Blackheath Park, a pavilion with a raised living floor, was one of the first post-war buildings to be listed. The practice also designed public housing for the Greater London Council and the London Borough of Southwark.

In 1964, Moro completed his first theatre, The Playhouse, Nottingham. It was one of the earliest theatres to be adaptable either as a proscenium stage or as a thrust stage ("peninsular"), projecting forward. Moro is quoted as saying that "a theatre, however attractive, which does not work backstage, is a nuisance: a theatre which has the correct technology, but no magic, is even worse." He also designed theatres at Hull University, the Theatre Royal, Plymouth (1982) with an adaptable auditorium, and three theatres at the Academy of Performing Arts, Hong Kong (1983–85).

He was appointed a Commander of the Order of the British Empire (CBE) in the 1977 New Year Honours.

Moro rejected criticisms of modern architecture, but in a way his whole output was a critique of what he called "the banality of functionalism", which, as he repeatedly demonstrated, could be overcome by the imaginative and technically skilful transformation of the ordinary.

National Life Stories conducted an oral history interview (C467/7) with Peter Moro in 1996 for its Architects Lives' collection held by the British Library.

== Personal ==
Moro married Anne Margaret Theodosia Vanneck (20 May 1918 – 2000), the daughter of William Vanneck, 5th Baron Huntingfield, on 2 March 1940. They had three daughters. The couple were divorced in 1994.
