= Ernst Moro =

Slovenian physician and pediatrician (1874-1951)

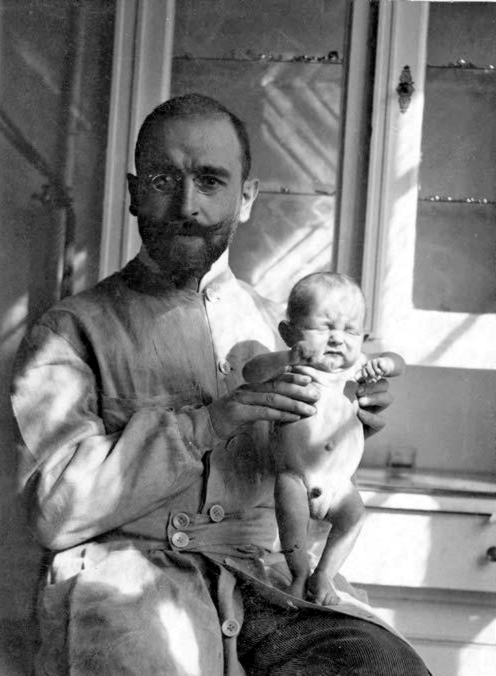
- Ernst Moro in 1904
- Born: 8 December 1874; Laibach, Duchy of Carniola, Austria-Hungary (today Ljubljana, Slovenia)
- Died: 17 April 1951 (aged 76); Heidelberg, West Germany
- Occupations: Physician pediatrician
- Known for: Moro reflex

Ernst Moro (1874–1951) was a Slovenian physician and pediatrician who was the first in western medicine to describe an infant reflex that was named after him (Moro reflex).

== Career ==
Moro studied medicine at the University of Graz, Austria, getting his M.D. in 1899. From 1901 to 1902 he worked with Theodor Escherich (1857–1911) in Vienna, the discoverer of the Escherichia coli bacterium. He earned his habilitation in pediatrics in Munich in 1906, and became a professor of pediatrics in the University of Heidelberg in 1911.

Besides the Moro reflex, he also became known for the following:

- Proved the sterility of the normal small intestine.
- Discovered that breast-fed children have stronger bactericidal activity in their blood than bottle-fed ones.
- First described the irritable colon syndrome or recurrent abdominal pain ("Nabelkoliken") in children
- Isolated the bacterium Lactobacillus acidophilus from the stomach of children, which is caused by the souring of milk products.
- Developed the Moro test (percutaneous tuberculin reaction).
- Coined the terms "first trimester" and "biological spring".
- Invented "Moro's milk", an infant-feeding formula composed by full cream milk with added 3% flour, 5% butter and 5-7% sugar.
- Invented Professor Moro's Carrot soup, which decreased the death rate of babies by diarrhea in Germany dramatically.
- Published about his later famous "apple diet" to cure diarrhea symptoms.

In 1936, after the Nazis came to power, Moro resigned from his chair at the University of Heidelberg, alleging reasons of health. However the real motive was that he was married to Grete Moro, née Königswald, of Jewish origin. He started a private clinic at Mozartstrasse 10 (where a commemorative plaque is now affixed) and retired in 1948.

== Professor Moro's Carrot Soup ==
In 1908, diarrhea killed many babies in Germany. Professor Moro, at that time the head of a children’s hospital in Heidelberg, found out by experiment that a simple carrot soup decreased the death rate of babies suffering from diarrhea by nearly 50%. The soup was made by cooking 500 grams of peeled and sliced carrots for one and a half hours in plenty of water, draining and puréeing. After cooking, 3 grams of salt were added, along with enough water until the soup pot contained a total of 1 liter of liquid.

A German study published in 2002 outlines that acidic oligosaccharides formed in aqueous extracts from carrots (carrot soup) may lead to less adherence of bacterial agents to the mucosal wall of the bowel, thus being a more effective treatment for acute gastrointestinal infections of children than glucose-electrolyte-solution oral rehydration.

In 2009, experiments showed that Professor Moro's Carrot Soup can treat diarrhea caused by antibiotic-resistant bacteria.

== Apple diet ==
In 1929, Moro announced his later famous "apple diet" for the treatment of diarrheal conditions. The colleague August Heisler had pointed out to Moro the effect of apples as an old folk remedy for intestinal catarrh. When the entire Eugenien Hall was infected with enteritis, all the children ate raw apple porridge. A later clinical trial confirmed the results of the trial at Eugenien Hall. In Moro's opinion, the tannin content of raw grated apples caused certain detoxification processes to alleviate the symptoms of dyspepsia, dysentery and agitation-like illnesses.

== Personal ==
Moro was married to Margarete Königswald. His son, Peter Moro, was a noted London architect.
