= Frontal release sign =

Primitive reflex reactivated by damage to the frontal lobes

- Differential diagnosis: Dementia

Frontal release signs are primitive reflexes traditionally held to be a sign of disorders that affect the frontal lobes. The appearance of such signs reflects the area of brain dysfunction rather than a specific disorder which may be diffuse, such as a dementia, or localised, such as a tumor.

One reflex thought to have good localizing value is the palmar grasp reflex which usually signifies damage to the frontal lobe of the opposite side. The glabellar reflex or "glabellar tap" is present in individuals with extrapyramidal disorders such as Parkinson's disease.

These reflexes are believed to be "hard-wired" before birth, and are therefore able to be elicited in the newborn. As the brain matures, certain areas (usually within the frontal lobes) exert an inhibitory effect, thus causing the reflex to disappear. When disease processes disrupt these inhibitory pathways, the reflex is "released" from inhibition and can be elicited once again, hence the term "frontal release sign".

Some frontal release signs and their role in infancy:

- Palmar grasp: Baby naturally grabs objects placed in palm.
- Palmomental reflex: stroking on the thenar eminence of the hand causes contraction of mentalis muscles of the chin.
- Rooting reflex: Baby finds breast to suckle.
- Sucking reflex: Baby sucks breast / bottle / teat to get milk.
- Snout reflex: Involved in suckling.
- Glabellar reflex: May protect eyes in certain situations.
