= Moro reflex =

Infantile reflex in response to loss of support

The Moro reflex in a four-day-old infant: 1) the reflex is initiated by pulling the infant up from the floor and then releasing him; 2) he spreads his arms; 3) he pulls his arms in; 4) he cries (10 seconds)

Moro reflex while sleeping

The Moro reflex is an infantile reflex that develops by 32 weeks of gestation and disappears at the sixth month of age. It is a response to a sudden loss of support and involves three distinct components:

1. spreading out the arms (abduction)
2. pulling the arms in (adduction)
3. crying (usually)

It is distinct from the startle response. Unlike the startle response, the Moro reflex does not decrease with repeated stimulation. The primary significance of the Moro reflex is in evaluating integration of the central nervous system.

== Eliciting the Moro reflex ==
Ernst Moro elicited the Moro reflex by slapping a pillow on both sides of the infant's head. Other methods have been used since then, including rapidly lowering the infant (while supported) to a sudden stop and pinching the skin of the abdomen. Today, the most common method is the head drop, where the infant is supported in both hands and tilted suddenly so the head is a few centimeters lower than the level of the body.

== Clinical significance ==
The Moro reflex may be observed in incomplete form in premature birth after the 28th week of gestation, and is usually present in complete form by week 32 (third trimester). Absence or asymmetry of either abduction or adduction by 2 to 3 months age can be regarded as abnormal, as can persistence of the reflex in infants older than 6 months. Furthermore, absence during the neonatal period may warrant assessment for the possibility of developmental complications such as birth injury or interference with brain formation. Asymmetry of the Moro reflex is especially useful to note, as it is almost always a feature of root, plexus, or nerve disease.

The Moro reflex is impaired or absent in infants with kernicterus. An exaggerated Moro reflex can be seen in infants with severe brain damage that occurred in-utero, including microcephaly and hydranencephaly. Exaggeration of the Moro reflex, manifesting either as low threshold or excessive clutching, often occurs in newborns with moderate hypoxic-ischemic encephalopathy. The Moro reflex is also exaggerated in infants withdrawing from narcotics. Persistence of the Moro reflex beyond 6 months of age is noted only in infants with severe neurological defects, including autism and cerebral palsy.

== History ==
The Moro reflex was first described in western medicine by pediatrician Ernst Moro (1874–1951) in 1918. Moro referred to it as the Umklammerungsreflex (embracing reflex). In this publication, he stated: "When a young infant is placed on the examination table and one taps with hands on both sides of the pillow, there follows a rapid symmetrical extending abduction of both extremities, which approach each other in adduction immediately thereafter". According to him, this reflex should disappear after the infant's first 3–6 months of life. Since then, the Moro reflex has been used to detect early neurological problems in infants. Absence or prolonged retention of Moro reflex can be signs that the infants need neurological attention.

== Function ==
The Moro reflex may be a survival instinct to help the infant cling to its mother. If the infant lost its balance, the reflex caused the infant to embrace its mother and regain its hold on the mother's body. The Moro reflex might also be an alarm signal from the baby who is about to lose support, and the spread arms provide extremities for where to be grabbed by its handler to prevent a fall.

== See also ==
- Primitive reflexes
