= Developmental differences in solitary facial expressions =

Facial expressions are used to communicate emotions. They can also occur solitarily, without other people being present. People often imagine themselves in social situations when alone, resulting in solitary facial expressions. Toddlers and children in early childhood use social cues and contexts to discriminate and recognize facial expressions. They develop at this early stage facial expressions in order to provoke reactions from their caregivers and receive nurturance and support. Children reflect their peers' emotions in their own expressions for social interaction.

Facial expression discrimination and expression develop at varying rates in children. During middle childhood and adolescence, the abilities to discriminate and produce facial expressions are still on their way toward achieving full potential. Considering that the ability to discriminate and produce facial expressions develop independently, there is a gap between a child's capacity to discriminate an emotion on another's face and their capacity to produce certain emotions, such as anger or fear. Fear and anger are more difficult expressions to produce than happiness, a possible explanation being that children are socialized not to produce these, considered socially undesirable. Further research is required to fully explore this idea.

== Discrimination and expression ==
Facial expressions are produced to express a reaction to a situation or event or to evoke a response from another individual or individuals. They are signals of emotion and social intent. People make faces in response to "direct audience effects" when they are watching sports, discussing politics, eating or smelling, in pain, and see or hear something humorous. While one may have the same emotional reaction to a particular situation, they are more likely to express this emotion via a facial expression if they are in a social situation. Smiles, in particular, are "evolved signaling displays [that] are the result of selective pressures for conspicuous, stereotyped, and redundant communication". Smiling is a visual signal that requires eye contact from the recipient to the one smiling and is intended to communicate a feeling of happiness and joy. In an experiment by Alan Fridlund, smiling occurred least when one was watching a video alone, then more often when a person was alone watching the video but believed a friend was performing another task, even more often when that person believed a friend was simultaneously watching the video somewhere else, and most often when one was watching a movie with a friend physically present. This evidence shows that even if someone has the same internal reaction to a stimulus (like a movie), they are more likely to externalize these feelings when surrounded by peers or under the assumption that peers are engaged in the same activity.

The production of facial expressions, however, is not solely limited to interpersonal situations. Since humans are largely social beings, they often imagine themselves in social situations even when they are alone. This phenomenon occurs in a variety of different contexts: treating oneself as a social interactant (talking to oneself), imagining others are present (either who are currently existent or have died), envisioning future social interactions, and personifying animals or inanimate objects (talking to pets). Solitary facial expressions are generated for an imagined other. According to role and impression- management theories, a perceived audience, whether real or imaginary, causes one to assume a role that is consistent with their audience. For example, a young girl may smile to herself in the mirror while imagining herself talking to a boy from class, but may grimace while imagining herself responding to her mother's scolding. Thus, "solitary faces occur for the same reasons as public ones, if only because when we are alone we create social interactions in our imaginations. They suggest the possibility that sociality may play a major role in the mediation of solitary faces". There are developmental differences in solitary facial expression, beginning with instinctive expressions in infancy and developing into more complex ones as a child's concept of sociality and emotion matures.

== Discrimination and production of facial expressions in infants ==
A concept of sociality is acquired over time and through various social interactions. It has long been theorized that children expand the ability to regulate their facial expressions during the course of their development and that their expressions become "socialized" as they grow up. But how soon does socialization start and how big of a role does it play during infancy?

Because infants cannot use words to tell us about their emotional states, their facial expressions are of particular importance. During infancy it is difficult to elicit discrete negative expressions like anger, distress and sadness, and, perhaps unsurprisingly, the most common infant facial expression is the "cry-face". Cry-face is thought to integrate aspects of both anger and distress expressions and may indicate a shared basis in negative emotionality. Smiling, on the other hand, is easily recognized as an expression of happiness, but even here there is a distinction between cheek-raising or Duchenne smiles and non-emotional smiles, which are thought to be used mainly as social signals. Even in 10-month-old infants, Duchenne smiles have been found to occur most often in reaction to infants' mothers.

According to Ekman and Friesen (1975), there are "display rules", influenced by one's culture, gender and family background which govern the way we modulate our emotional expression. Studies investigating mother-infant interaction suggest that infants are exposed to these "display rules" first during face-to-face play with mom. In a study performed by Malatesta and Haviland (1982) researchers found evidence that changes in emotional expression during infancy are greatly influenced by this type of interaction and that there were differences among infants under 6 months of age based on both gender and family background. This suggests that during infancy these "display rules" are already taking effect.

== Facial expression development in toddlers through early childhood ==
Following infancy, the discrimination and production of facial expressions improves as toddlers grow into early childhood. At young ages, children know what the most common facial expressions look like (expressions of happiness or sadness), what they mean, and what kinds of situations typically elicit them. Children develop these skills at very early stages in life and continue to improve facial recognition, discrimination, and imitation between the ages of 3 and 10. One study showed that toddler's spontaneous facial expressions reflect the emotions shown by other toddlers, this is called "decoding". This indicates that facial expressions are affected by the social environment, and are an important aspect in creating relationships with others in our social groups.

In one study, researchers found that facial expressions of sadness may be more beneficial for toddlers than other expressions when eliciting support from the social environment. The ability to regulate expressions of sadness in order to provoke comforting behavior from caregivers can develop as young as the age of 24 months in toddlers. This suggests that there is more emphasis on the presence of others that elicit certain facial expressions in the stages of early childhood and toddlers. The "differential emotions theory suggests that different distress emotions have distinct adaptive social functions" or reactions from the social environment. For example, the distress call of anger from a toddler most likely will elicit a reaction of discipline from the caregiver, while an expression of fear would elicit the reaction of comfort from the caregiver. Social situations induce facial expressions in toddlers and children in early childhood, although there is not enough evidence to indicate that they understand these expressions as emotions. For example, a young child could express sadness when his or her mother is in the room in order to elicit a nurturing reaction from her. Though, at this stage (and adolescence), the child's discrimination of facial expressions develops at a different rate than the production of facial expressions. Therefore, young children are more readily able to discriminate expressions of sadness or anger, but the production of these negative expressions is much more difficult. Many of these studies show toddlers and children in early childhood showing facial expression in a social context, however there is not enough research on their solitary facial expressions.

== Development of solitary facial expressions in middle childhood through adolescence ==
While there remains a general gap in the literature regarding the production of facial expressions and the processes which underlie this production at middle childhood and adolescence ages, research has been done to assess the overall production capabilities of children ranging in ages 5–13. Results generally indicate that the ability to produce facial emotion increases with age and is slightly correlated with the ability to discriminate the facial expressions of another. Odom and Lemond (1972) created a study to test the potential for "a developmental lag between the perception and production of facial expressions," meaning they were looking to uncover a relationship between previously created schemas and mental representations of different expressions and the ability to transform these representations into facial expression. They operated using the logical assumption that coding perceptions of expressions comes before the discrimination of expressions which then precedes production. Upon assessing two differing age groups, one in kindergarten and the other in fifth grade, they discovered that there is a lag between perception and production of facial expressions, however this lag does not decrease with age. Production and discrimination do not develop at the same rate. Odom and Lemond (1972) have arrived at the far conclusion that production of facial expressions will never be at the same level of discrimination of facial expressions, which supports the findings of another study by Izard (1971) who found that even adults have difficulty producing requested expressions. Despite this, the increased accurate productions of the older kids was found to be due to their discrimination abilities yet the older children still made many errors leading researchers to believe that full discrimination abilities are not at full potential at the middle childhood and adolescence stage of development.

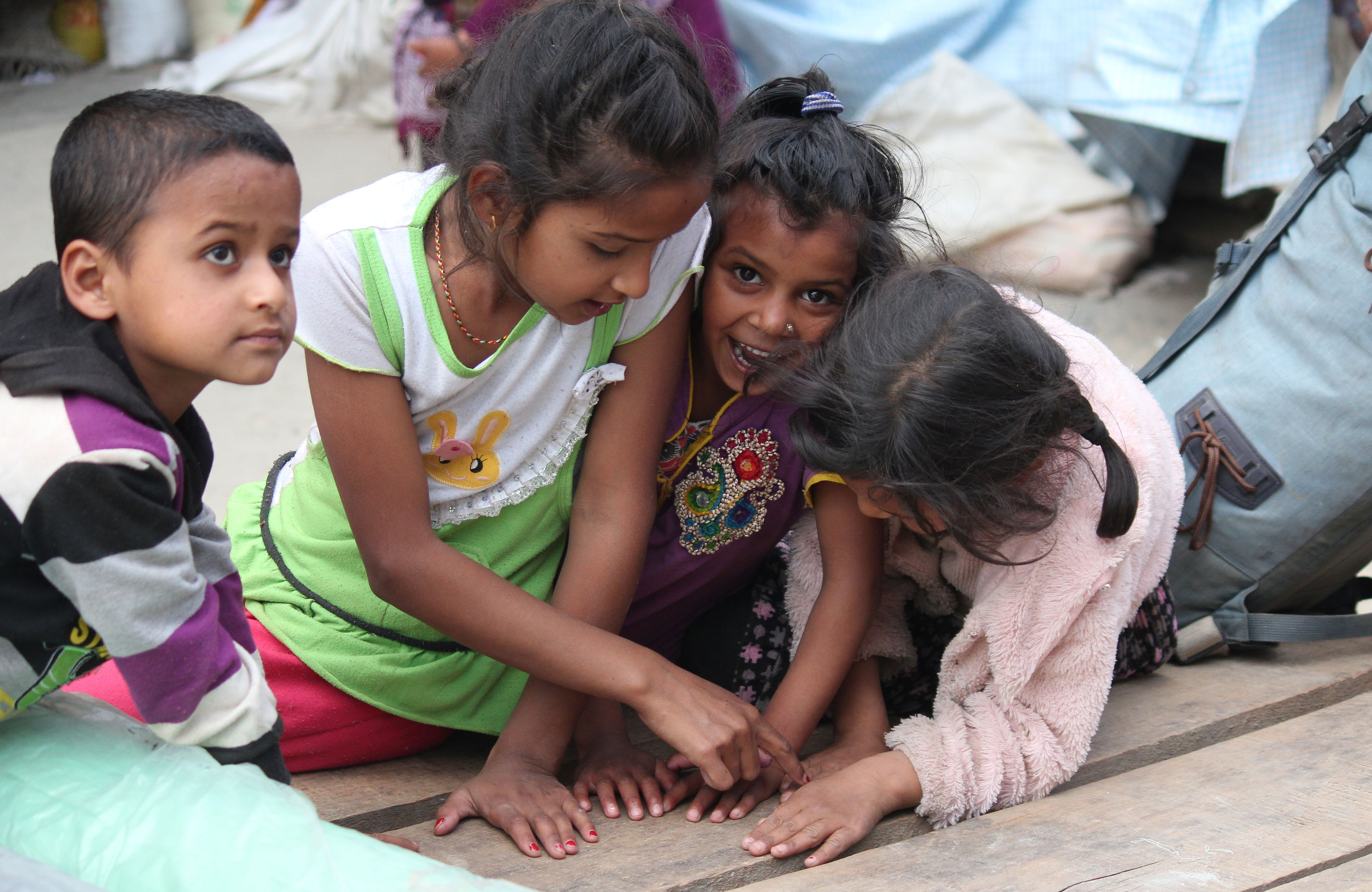
Children in Nepal playing happily.

Further, Ekman, Roper and Hager (1980) researched the different means of producing facial expressions which could be influenced by age. They found studies completed by Charlesworth and Kreutzer (1973) and Ekman and Oster (1979) who classified two methods of facial expression. They categorized deliberate action as an imitation of an observed expression or making a face which relates to a memory. Generating emotion is a more complex process with an individual focuses on an experience and attempts to relive that experience in order to create an emotional expression. They suggested age as an impact on the ability to utilize these processes considering the developmental requirements might not be met in order to use one or the other of the aforementioned skills. The study completed by Ekman, Roper and Hager (1980) consisted of three groups of children, the first group having a mean age of 5 years, the second 9 years and the third 13 years. Their results include a significantly larger increase in ability to produce facial movements between the ages of 5 and 9 rather than between the ages 9 and 13.

Additionally, both Ekman, Roper and Hager (1980) and Odom and Lemond (1972) found the expressions for fear, sadness and anger to be the most difficult to produce. Odom and Lemond (1972) give a potential explanation for this using a suggestion made by Izard (1971) that "expression production may be inhibited by socialization training". The significance of this is that some expressions, such as anger or sadness, are socially undesirable. Therefore, socializing agents may discourage such expressions leading to a smaller chance that older children will produce such expressions spontaneously.
