= Glabella =

Skin area between eyebrows and nose

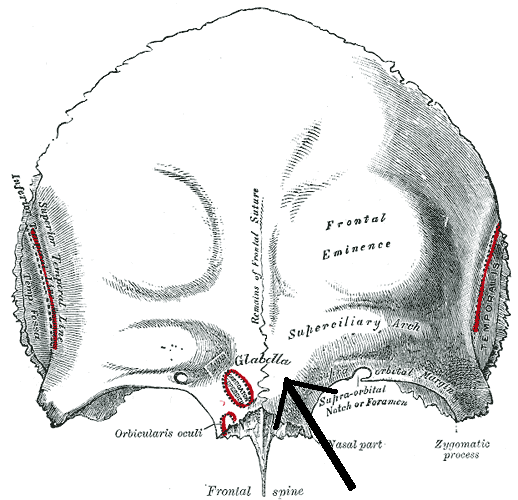
- Frontal bone, outer surface, (glabella visible near bottom of bone)

- Side view of head, showing surface relations of bones (glabella labeled at center left)

Details

Identifiers
- Latin: glabella
- TA98: A02.1.03.006
- TA2: 525
- FMA: 52851

The glabella, in humans, is the area of skin between the eyebrows and above the nose. The term also refers to the underlying bone that is slightly depressed, and joins the two brow ridges. It is a cephalometric landmark that is just superior to the nasion.

== Etymology ==
The term for the area is the feminine of glabellus, "hairless" in Latin, from glaber, "smooth".

== Function ==
The glabella is a key anatomical landmark used in craniofacial measurements, including interglabellar distance, which helps assess facial proportions in aesthetics and surgery. It also contributes to facial expressions through the action of muscles like the frontalis and orbicularis oculi.

== In medical science ==
The skin of the glabella may be used to measure skin turgor in suspected cases of dehydration by gently pinching and lifting it. When released, the glabella of a dehydrated patient tends to remain extended ("tented"), rather than returning to its normal shape.

== See also ==
- Glabellar reflex

== Sources ==
- Walker, Hannah M.; Chauhan, Pradip R. (2023-07-24). "Anatomy, Head and Neck: Glabella". StatPearls Publishing. PMID 32310453.
