= Palmomental reflex =

Reflexive twitch of the chin muscle

The palmomental reflex (PMR) or Marinescu-Radovici Sign or Kinn reflex or Marinescu Reflex is a primitive reflex consisting of a twitch of the chin muscle elicited by stroking a specific part of the palm. It is present in infancy and disappears as the brain matures during childhood but may reappear due to processes that disrupt the normal cortical inhibitory pathways. Therefore, it is an example of a frontal release sign.

== Eliciting and observing response ==
The thenar eminence is stroked briskly with a thin stick, from proximal (edge of wrist) to distal (base of thumb) using moderate pressure. A positive response is considered if there is a single visible twitch of the ipsilateral mentalis muscle (chin muscle on the same side as the hand tested).

== Clinical relevance ==
In their seminal 1920 paper, Gheorghe Marinescu and Anghel Radovici hypothesized that both the afferent (receptive) and efferent (motor) arms of the reflex are on the same side (ipsilateral) to the hand stimulated; this hypothesis remains unsubstantiated.

The PMR has been found to be present more frequently in various neurological conditions, both localized and diffuse. These include congenital conditions such as Down syndrome, where it is unclear whether the reflex persists throughout life, or disappears and then re-appears in association with the onset of Alzheimer's disease pathology. The reflex is common in the elderly population and should not be taken as indicative of a dementing process.

A study conducted in a neurosurgical in-patient population showed there is no significant association between the side of the reflex and the side of the hemispheric lesion in patients with unilateral (one-sided) reflexes and unilateral (one-sided) lesions.

Primitive reflexes such as the PMR were classically viewed as signs of disorders that affect the frontal lobes; this traditional view is questionable, as the reflex has been noted, for example, in cases of one-sided temporal lobe pathology.
