= Snout reflex =

Pouting of the lips reflex

The Snout reflex (also orbicularis oris reflex) or a "Pout" is a pouting or pursing of the lips that is elicited by light tapping of the closed lips near the midline. The contraction of the muscles causes the mouth to resemble a snout.

This reflex is tested in a neurological exam and if present, is a sign of brain damage or dysfunction. Along with the "suck", palmomental reflexes and other reflexes, snout is considered a frontal release sign. These reflexes are normally inhibited by frontal lobe activity in the brain, but can be "released" from inhibition if the frontal lobes are damaged. They are normally present in infancy, however, and until about one year of age, leading to the hypothesis that they are primitive or archaic reflexes.

Frontal release signs are seen in disorders that affect the frontal lobes, such as dementias, metabolic encephalopathies, closed head injuries, and hydrocephalus. All of these disorders produce diffuse cerebral damage, usually involving many areas and systems in addition to the frontal lobes and pyramidal system, so the frontal release signs are not sufficient for a diagnosis.

== Sources ==
- Walker, Hall and Hurst. Clinical Methods: The history, physical and laboratory examinations, 3rd ed.
