= Palmar grasp reflex =

Primitive and involuntary reflex

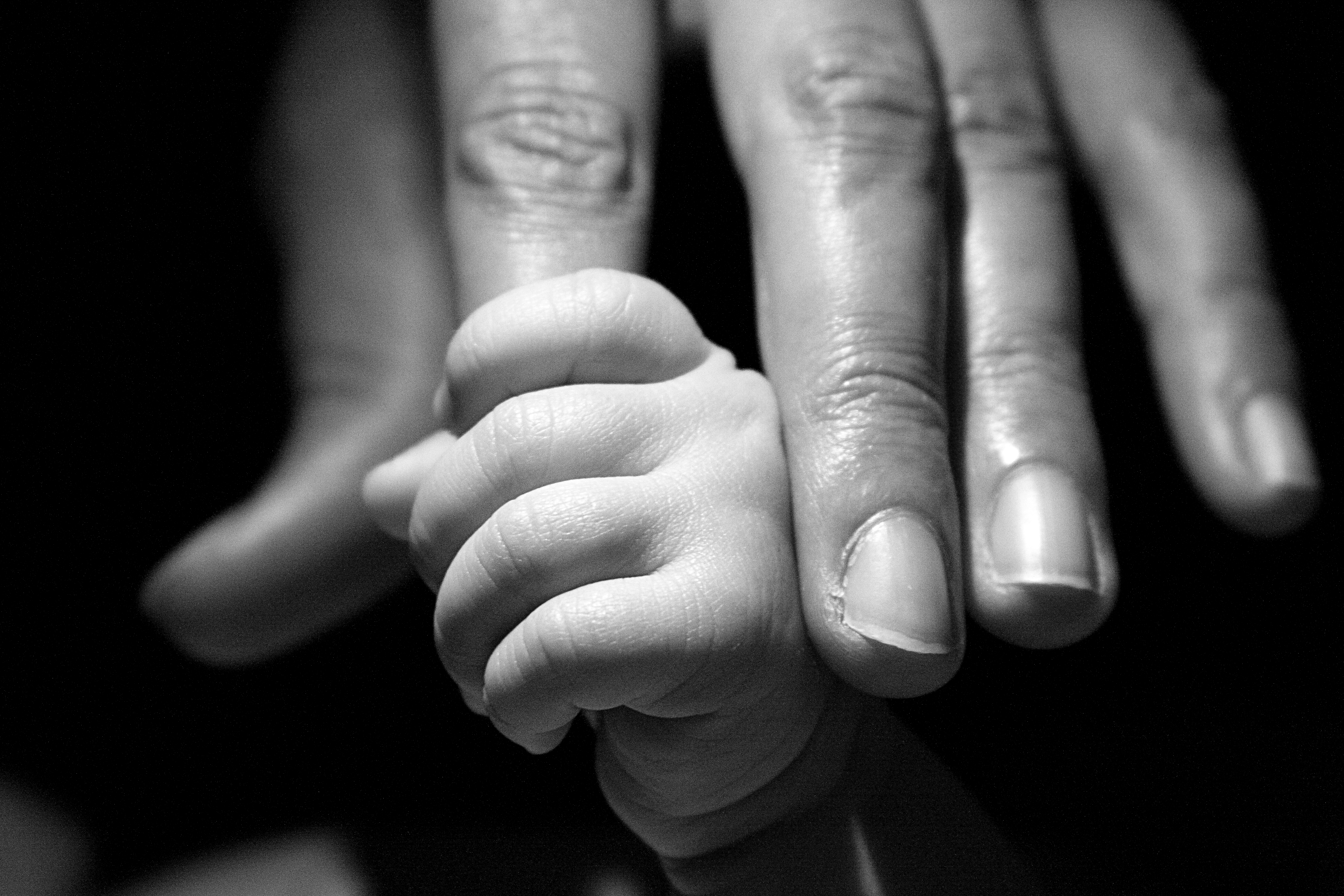
Infant grasping adult finger

The palmar grasp reflex (or grasp reflex) is a primitive and involuntary reflex found in infants of humans and most primates. When an object, such as an adult finger, is placed in an infant's palm, the infant's fingers reflexively grasp the object. Placement of the object triggers a spinal reflex, resulting from stimulation of tendons in the palm, that gets transmitted through motor neurons in the median and ulnar sensory nerves. The reverse motion can be induced by stroking the back or side of the hand. A fetus exhibits the reflex in utero by 28 weeks into gestation (sometimes, as early as 16 weeks), and persists until development of rudimentary fine motor skills between two and six months of age.

== Evolutionary significance ==
Biologists have found that the reflex is significantly more frequent in infants of fur carrying primate species. It is theorized that the grasping reflex evolved as it is essential to survival in species, usually primates, where the young are carried in the fur. The infant's ability to grasp onto a mother's fur allows the mother to keep the infant with her while foraging for food or moving from one place to another. This is beneficial to the mother because she does not lose function of her limbs or mouth (as she would from oral carrying). Carrying the infant with the mother also gives a degree of safety to the infant, which it would not have if it were left in a nest or other location away from the mother. The grasp reflex also allows young individuals to have more developed food manipulation and dexterity skills. This suggests that the grasping reflex is vestigial in humans and in other non-fur carrying primates. The reflex is also suggested to create a basis for which the voluntary grasping action originates. This comes from the maturation of higher motor centers, allowing a child to exert more control over the body.

== Clinical significance ==
In humans, absence of the palmar grasp reflex or persistence of the reflex can both be indicators of neurodevelopmental abnormalities. In a normal infant, the palmar grasp reflex is present during the first three months of age and disappears by six months of age. Disappearance of the reflex has been attributed to conscious and voluntary hand use. Based on collected evidence, there is no significant difference between the reflexes of normal-term and pre-term infants.

Absence of the grasp reflex could indicate a neural communication error with the spinal cord. In other words, signals from the stimulation of tendons in the palm are being interrupted before they have a chance to make it to the spinal cord, resulting in a lack of the reflex. Absence of the grasp reflex could also be an indicator of peripheral nerve injury or injury to the spinal cord. Persistence of the grasp reflex could be an indication of brain lesions or cerebral palsy. Presence of the reflex in infants older than four months could be an indicator of damage to the central nervous system. This damage could be a result of neural degeneration, lack of oxygen in the brain, or other genetic factors. Any abnormal response for this reflex could produce suspicion for an underlying disease that would need to be addressed. That is why the elicitation of this grasp reflex is part of neurological examinations for newborns.
