= Spinal cord stroke =

Rare type of stroke

Spinal cord stroke is a rare type of stroke with compromised blood flow to any region of spinal cord owing to occlusion or bleeding, leading to irreversible neuronal death. It can be classified into two types, ischaemia and haemorrhage, in which the former accounts for 86% of all cases, a pattern similar to cerebral stroke. The disease is either arisen spontaneously from aortic illnesses or postoperatively. It deprives patients of motor function or sensory function, and sometimes both. Infarction usually occurs in regions perfused by anterior spinal artery, which spans the anterior two-thirds of spinal cord. Preventions of the disease include decreasing the risk factors and maintaining enough spinal cord perfusion pressure during and after the operation. The process of diagnosing the ischemic and hemorrhagic spinal cord stroke includes applying different MRI protocols and CT scan. Treatments for spinal cord stroke are mainly determined by the symptoms and the causes of the disease. For example, antiplatelet and corticosteroids might be used to reduce the risk of blood clots in ischaemic spinal stroke patients, while rapid surgical decompression is applied to minimize neurological injuries in haemorrhagic spinal stroke patients instead. Patients may spend years for rehabilitation after the spinal cord stroke.

== Signs and symptoms ==
Signs and symptoms are related to the portion of spinal cord affected, and appear below the level of lesion. Abrupt onset of pain at the back or neck marks the location of ischaemia or hemorrhage at the beginning, which radiates as the damage intensifies. Temporary paresis in limbs may occur days before the onset of spinal ischaemic stroke, though the relationship remains unclear. While it takes minutes for ischaemic spinal stroke to develop the symptoms, the time could be extended to days and weeks in hemorrhagic spinal stroke. Infarction occurs predominantly in arteries, and the watershed region, which refers thoracic spinal cord here, is highly susceptible to ischaemic attack. Patients with a male gender, younger age, lower body mass index, hypertension, diabetes mellitus, renal insufficiency and chronic obstructive pulmonary disease are predisposed to higher risks of severe spinal cord stroke.

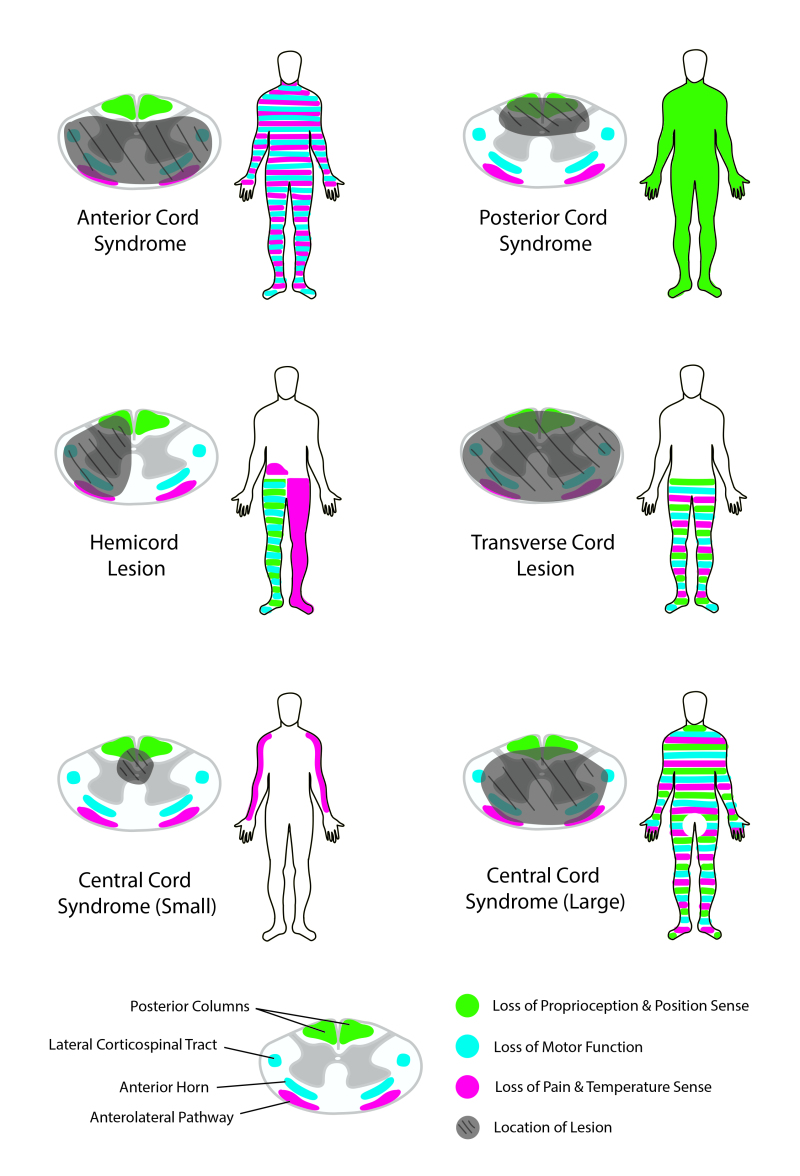
Symptoms of various types of spinal cord stroke.

=== Anterior spinal cord syndrome ===
A major feature is losing motor function such as voluntary movement, reflexes and coordination as a result of compromised anterior and lateral corticospinal tract, anterior grey matter and spinocerebellar tract. There is also a loss in nociception and thermosensation as a result of interrupted spinothalamic tract.

=== Posterior spinal cord syndrome ===
Sensory functions namely vibration, fine touch, and proprioception are undermined, which are associated to dorsal column. Unlike anterior spinal cord stroke, motor functions are not handicapped in posterior spinal cord stroke.

=== Central spinal cord syndrome ===
In central spinal cord syndrome, impairment of motor function in the upper body is considerably more severe than that of lower body, which is related to hyperextension of corticospinal tracts and spinocerebellar tract in cervical spinal cord, accompanied by dysfunction in urinary bladder and sensational loss at a varying degree.

=== Brown-Séquard syndrome ===
Brown-Séquard syndrome is only the subtype that affects the spinal cord unilaterally, either anteriorly, posteriorly, or both. Ipsilateral loss of vibration, fine touch, body position perception and fine movement control, as well as contralateral loss of axial muscles and movement coordination are found. Spasticity followed by dysfunctinoal regulation of muscle tone also exists.

=== Transverse ===
Death of cells at the complete transverse level is presented clinically as lower paraplegia or quadriplegia, sensory loss below the lesion, urinary incontinence, and disturbances in autonomous nervous system and hormonal system.

== Causes ==
Diseases in aorta are recognized as a widely seen contributor of spontaneous spinal cord ischaemia, represented by rupturing of thoracic aortic aneurysm, arterial occlusion by aortic intima separated from endothelial wall in aortic dissection, and aortic coarctation. Embolism, meningeal inflammation at spinal cord, global ischaemia and abusing nicotinic drugs are also identified to factors.

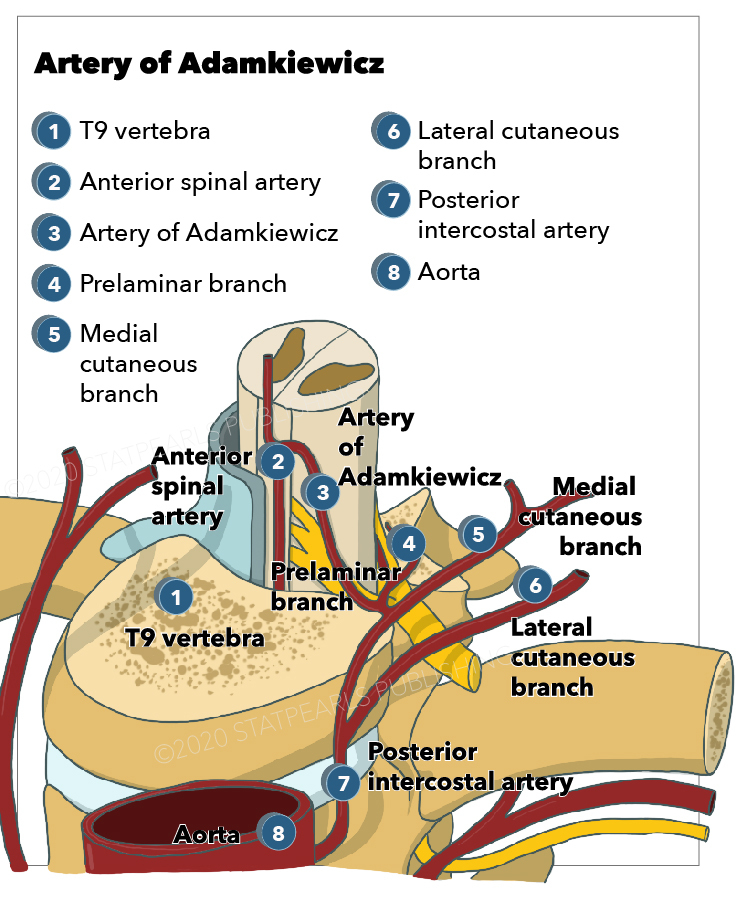
Artery of Adamkiewicz is supplied by posterior intercostal artery, and drains into anterior spinal artery.

Aortic surgeries contribute to many iatrogenic spinal cord ischaemia, although its percentage is much lower than that of spontaneous type. Thoracic endovascular aortic repair (TEVAR) was carried out to introduce a stent graft in order to treat thoracoabdominal aortic aneurysm, a condition of enlarged aorta with weakened vascular wall, as well as traumas and atherosclerosis. Segmental medullary arteries, notably the artery of Adamkiewicz, could be excluded from circulation after blockage of intercostal arteries by the device, which directly branches from descending aorta. Furthermore, during open repair, blood flow within aorta is halted by clamping to facilitate the sewing of interposition graft. The reduced blood flow to anterior and posterior radicular artery could trigger spinal stroke. Cases of spinal stroke following operations like aortography, spinal anesthesia and lumbar spine surgery are reported.

Abnormalities in blood vessels including arteriovenous malformations, arteriovenous fistulas and cavernomas are preferably presented as ischaemia and occasionally hemorrhage. The direct fusion between arteries and veins increases blood pressure in radiculomedullary vein and coronal venous plexus, which is an important factor of venous congestive myelopathy and infarction.

Prolonged compression on the blood network by vertebral diseases such as cervical spondylosis and protruded intervertebral disks can be attributed to acute ischaemia in spinal cord, yet the correlation is uncertain.

On the other hand, trauma, which generally originates from terminal vascular network, is a common cause of spinal cord hemorrhage for all four subtypes, namely haematomyelia, subarachnoid hemorrhage, subdural hemorrhage and epidural hemorrhage. There is a correlation between anticoagulating drugs and hemorrhagic stroke.

Causes are often not clearly defined in clinical settings.

== Mechanism ==
The pathophysiology of spinal stroke is similar to its counterpart in brain. Decreasing blood flow hampers oxygen and glucose delivery to neurones, causing a huge decline in ATP production and failure of calcium pump. The rising intracellular calcium level activates a series of enzymes like phospholipase A_{2} (PLA_{2}), COX-2, calcineurin, calpain, mitogen-activated protein kinase, nitric oxide synthase, matrix metalloproteinases (MMPs) to produce proinflammatory and proapoptotic chemicals. There are also activation of cytokines and changes in transcription factors. Meanwhile, glutamate is released to extracellular space and binds to its excitatory receptors, further exacerbating calcium influx and a cascade of events involving mitochondrial, cell membrane damage, and production of reactive oxygen species. Such excitotoxicity is closely associated with the eventual neuronal cell death and loss of tract function.

== Prevention ==
=== Risk factors ===
Modifiable risk factors that contribute to the common strokes such as hypertension and heart disease, are found less commonly in the formation of spinal cord stroke. On the other hand, diabetes mellitus, peripheral artery disease, smoking and cholesterol are associated more with such disease. Prevention and treatment of these modifiable risk factors could reduce the likelihood of spinal cord stroke.

=== Intraoperative strategy ===
As the high difficulty for the detection during operation, somatosensory evoked potential monitoring or motor evoked potential monitoring is necessary to early detect the spinal cord ischaemia in anesthetized patients for quick intervention. Cerebrospinal fluid drainage is always used to decrease intraspinal pressure and increase blood flow to the spinal cord to avoid hypotension, thus reducing the risk of spinal cord ischaemia.

=== Postoperative strategy ===
Probability of postoperative spinal cord stroke is linked to both aneurysm extent, particularly extent II (descending aorta at full length) and length of graft, which highlights the importance of postoperative management. It aims to maintain enough spinal cord perfusion pressure, and make serial neurologic assessments to detect the disease. Similar to the intraoperative strategy, increasing the spinal cord perfusion as an immediate intervention may increase the chance of successful treatment. Neurological examination should be conducted after anesthesia to test the motor function of the low extremity of patients. By using this method to detect whether patients have spinal cord ischaemia, doctors could decide whether rapid treatment should be provided.

== Diagnosis ==
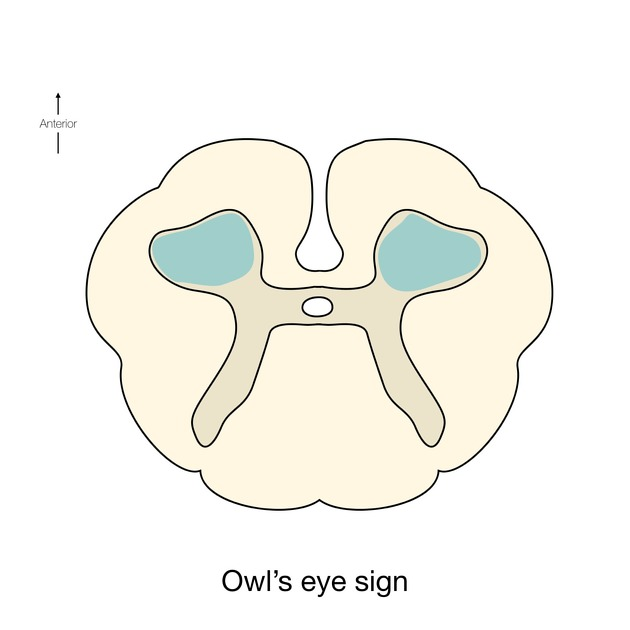
Owl-eyes sign exhibits bilaterally symmetric circular to ovoid foci of T2-weighted signals in anterior horn cells.

Spinal stroke could be easily misdiagnosed because of its rarity. Doctor will first assess the clinical symptoms of the patient, such as paralysis, sensory loss and urinary and bowel dysfunction, to determine whether it is possible for the spinal stroke. After that, different MRI protocols will be used, including axial and sagittal T1 and T2-weighted sequences and diffusion-weighted imaging (DWI).

=== Ischemic spinal cord stroke ===
As the non-contrast CT and spine CT angiography are ineffective in imaging modalities, doctors use MRI to confirm the diagnosis. MRI findings, including pencillike hyperintensities on T2-weighted sagittal images and "owl's eyes" or "snake eyes" sign on T2 axial images, indicate the infarction is predominately in the watershed area of the gray matter of ventral horn (anterior spinal artery infarct). Also, posterior paramedian triangular hyperintensity in T2 hyperintensity indicates posterior spinal artery infarct. On a T1 sequence, we may also observe a cord expansion and a decreased signal. However, traditional MRI may show no abnormality especially for those patients in the acute phase. DWI is very sensitive for early detection of spinal cord infarction and shows a typical high signal intensity.

=== Hemorrhagic spinal cord stroke ===
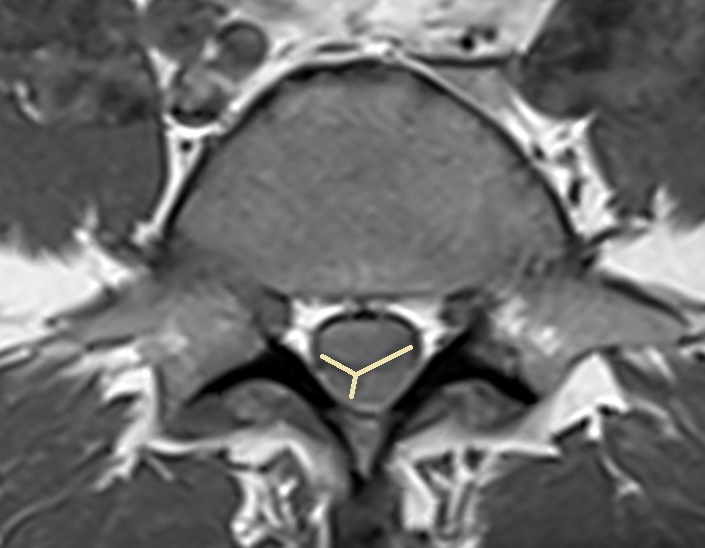
On axial imaging of MRI at the level of the denticulate ligaments, the inverted Mercedes-Benz sign denotes the form taken on by a spinal subdural hematoma.

To identify the hematoma in the spinal cord, MRI with and without gadolinium enhancement is the preferred choice. CT is also used to identify the hemorrhage and provide evidence for pathological analysis. Complete spinal MRI with MR angiography is used when patients with subarachnoid hemorrhage without the intracranial etiology. As the evaluation of the need for intradural interrogation is important, it is necessary to differentiate between subdural and epidural hematomas. Based on the location of the hematoma, use both axial and sagittal images of MRI to identify the boundary between hematoma and fat. An inverted Mercedes-Benz sign shows the spinal subdural hematoma on the axial image.

== Treatment ==
Given the rarity and heterogeneity of spinal cord stroke, symptomatic treatment of associated complications is applied, which is based on patients' own circumstances.

=== Ischemic spinal cord stroke ===
Although some literature suggest that thrombolysis could be the treatment for ischaemic spinal stroke, the associated risks are unknown due to the scarce data. If the cause is global hypoperfusion, maintaining enough blood pressure to maintain adequate spinal perfusion is needed. Also, anticoagulant and antiplatelet agents have been prescribed to prevent vascular occlusion or embolism. Corticosteroids are prescribed in situations of vasculitis or aortitis.

=== Hemorrhagic spinal cord stroke ===
==== Surgical decompression ====
The goal of treatment in an acute situation is to relieve pressure on the spinal cord. Several case studies show a substantial link between the time from bleeding to surgical decompression and neurological outcome, with the greatest results coming from individuals who had surgery within 12 hours after symptom onset. Therefore, surgical decompression should be undertaken as soon as possible to limit neurological injury.

===== Administration of large dose corticosteroids =====
While waiting for surgery, high-dose corticosteroids were administered in the acute phase. It could reduce oedema and secondary cord compression.

===== Reversal of anticoagulation =====
As anticoagulation treatment with warfarin or heparin has been linked to spontaneous haematomyelia, reversal anticoagulation is used to reduce the risk of bleeding by using suitable antidotes. Protamine is used to reverse heparin and low-molecular-weight heparin. Vitamin K is a reversal agent for warfarin.

== Prognosis ==
Full recovery is possible for spinal cord ischaemia patients. Although the mortality rate after spinal cord ischaemia is relatively high (23%), 58% of survivors ambulated with or without gait assistance at their final follow-up appointment. Patients with total paraplegia and sensory loss at nadir can nevertheless experience significant progress over months to years.
