= Radicular artery =

The anterior and posterior radicular arteries are 32 pairs of small/ variously sized arteries that enter an intervertebral foramen, bifurcating within it to form an anterior and a posterior radicular artery which accompany the anterior root and posterior root of a spinal nerve, respectively. They supply the corresponding spinal cord segment as well as the anterior and posterior root of the spinal nerve and its sensory ganglion (dorsal root ganglion).

At the level of the lumbosacral enlargement, a relatively large radicular artery (the great radicular artery) that reaches the spinal cord is often present.

== Anatomy ==
=== Supply ===
The radicular arteries are crucial for adequate arterial supply of most of the spinal cord as the anterior and posterior spinal artery do not provide sufficient arterial supply to the spinal cord by themselves - with the exception of the cervical portion of the spinal cord. An injury to a spinal nerve may thus also entail an injury to the corresponding radicular artery with consequent ischaemic damage to the corresponding spinal cord segment.

The radicular arteries additionally provide arterial supply to the posterior and anterior roots of a spinal nerve as well as the sensory ganglion.

== Relationship with segmental medullary arteries ==
In the thoracolumbar region, most segmental medullary arteries regress during early development to form radicular arteries; those that persist give off radicular arteries as branches. Radicular arteries can sometimes be functionally replaced by segmental medullary arteries. However, unlike those arteries, radicular arteries do not form anastamoses with the anterior or posterior spinal arteries. Radicular arteries are also generally smaller. The so-called great radicular artery it is in fact a segmental medullary artery.
