= Spinal cord injury =

Injury to the main nerve bundle in the back of humans

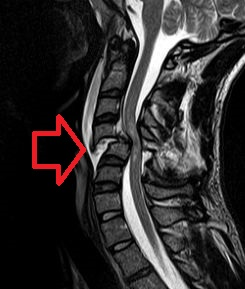
- MRI of a fractured and dislocated cervical vertebra (C4) in the neck that is compressing the spinal cord
- Specialty: Neurosurgery
- Types: Complete, incomplete
- Diagnostic method: Based on symptoms, medical imaging
- Treatment: Spinal motion restriction, intravenous fluids, vasopressors
- Frequency: c. 12,000 annually in the United States

A spinal cord injury (SCI) is damage to the spinal cord that causes temporary or permanent changes in its function. It is a destructive neurological and pathological state that causes major motor, sensory and autonomic dysfunctions.

Symptoms of spinal cord injury may include loss of muscle function, sensation, or autonomic function in the parts of the body served by the spinal cord below the level of the injury. Injury can occur at any level of the spinal cord and can be complete, with a total loss of sensation and muscle function at lower sacral segments, or incomplete, meaning some nervous signals are able to travel past the injured area of the cord up to the Sacral S4-5 spinal cord segments. Depending on the location and severity of damage, the symptoms vary, from numbness to paralysis, including bowel or bladder incontinence. Long term outcomes also range widely, from full recovery to permanent tetraplegia (also called quadriplegia) or paraplegia. Complications can include muscle atrophy, loss of voluntary motor control, spasticity, pressure sores, infections, and breathing problems.

In the majority of cases the damage results from physical trauma such as car accidents, gunshot wounds, falls, or sports injuries, but it can also result from nontraumatic causes such as infection, insufficient blood flow, and tumors. Just over half of injuries affect the cervical spine, while 15% occur in each of the thoracic spine, border between the thoracic and lumbar spine, and lumbar spine alone. Diagnosis is typically based on symptoms and medical imaging.

Efforts to prevent SCI include individual measures such as using safety equipment, societal measures such as safety regulations in sports and traffic, and improvements to equipment. Treatment starts with restricting further motion of the spine and maintaining adequate blood pressure. Corticosteroids have not been found to be useful. Other interventions vary depending on the location and extent of the injury, from bed rest to surgery. In many cases, spinal cord injuries require long-term physical and occupational therapy, especially if it interferes with activities of daily living.

In the United States, about 12,000 people annually survive a spinal cord injury. The most commonly affected group are young adult males. SCI has seen great improvements in its care since the middle of the 20th century. Research into potential treatments includes stem cell implantation, hypothermia, engineered materials for tissue support, epidural spinal stimulation, and wearable robotic exoskeletons.

== Classification ==
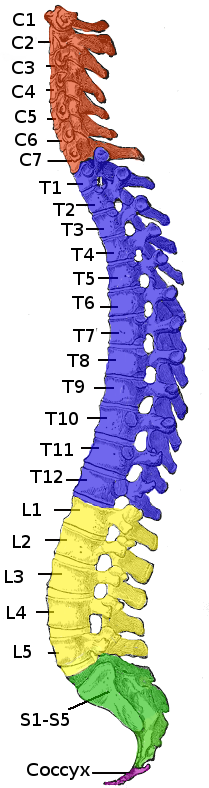
The effects of injury depend on the level along the spinal column (left). A dermatome is an area of the skin that sends sensory messages to a specific spinal nerve (right).	Spinal nerves exit the spinal cord between each pair of vertebrae.

Spinal cord injury can be traumatic or nontraumatic, and can be classified into three types based on cause: mechanical forces, toxic, and ischemic from lack of blood flow. The damage can also be divided into primary and secondary injury: the cell death that occurs immediately in the original injury, and biochemical cascades that are initiated by the original insult and cause further tissue damage. These secondary injury pathways include the ischemic cascade, inflammation, swelling, cell suicide, and neurotransmitter imbalances. They can take place for minutes or weeks following the injury.

At each level of the spinal column, spinal nerves branch off from either side of the spinal cord and exit between a pair of vertebrae, to innervate a specific part of the body. The area of skin innervated by a specific spinal nerve is called a dermatome, and the group of muscles innervated by a single spinal nerve is called a myotome. The part of the spinal cord that was damaged corresponds to the spinal nerves at that level and below. Injuries can be cervical 1–8 (C1–C8), thoracic 1–12 (T1–T12), lumbar 1–5 (L1–L5), or sacral (S1–S5). A person's level of injury is defined as the lowest level of full sensation and function. Paraplegia occurs when the legs are affected by the spinal cord damage (in thoracic, lumbar, or sacral injuries), and tetraplegia occurs when all four limbs are affected (cervical damage).

SCI is also classified by the degree of impairment. The International Standards for Neurological Classification of Spinal Cord Injury (ISNCSCI), published by the American Spinal Injury Association (ASIA), is widely used to document sensory and motor impairments following SCI. It is based on neurological responses, touch and pinprick sensations tested in each dermatome, and strength of the muscles that control key motions on both sides of the body.

Muscle strength		ASIA Impairment Scale for classifying spinal cord injury	
Grade	Muscle function	Grade	Description
0	No muscle contraction	A	Complete injury. No motor or sensory function is preserved in the sacral segments S4 or S5.
1	Muscle flickers	B	Sensory incomplete. Sensory but not motor function is preserved below the level of injury, including the sacral segments.
2	Full range of motion, gravity eliminated	C	Motor incomplete. Motor function is preserved below the level of injury, and more than half of muscles tested below the level of injury have a muscle grade less than 3 (see muscle strength scores, left).
3	Full range of motion, against gravity	D	Motor incomplete. Motor function is preserved below the level of injury and at least half of the key muscles below the neurological level have a muscle grade of 3 or more.
4	Full range of motion against resistance	E	Normal. No motor or sensory deficits, but deficits existed in the past.
5	Normal strength		

Muscle strength is scored on a scale of 0–5 according to the table above, and sensation is graded on a scale of 0–2: 0 is no sensation, 1 is altered or decreased sensation, and 2 is full sensation. Each side of the body is graded independently.

=== Complete and incomplete injuries ===
Level and completeness of injuries
	Complete	Incomplete
Tetraplegia	18.3%	34.1%
Paraplegia	23.0%	18.5%

In a "complete" spinal injury, all functions below the injured area are lost, whether or not the spinal cord is severed. An "incomplete" spinal cord injury involves preservation of motor or sensory function below the level of injury in the spinal cord. To be classed as incomplete, there must be some preservation of sensation or motion in the areas innervated by S4 to S5, including voluntary external anal sphincter contraction. The nerves in this area are connected to the very lowest region of the spinal cord, and retaining sensation and function in these parts of the body indicates that the spinal cord is only partially damaged. Incomplete injury by definition includes a phenomenon known as sacral sparing: some degree of sensation is preserved in the sacral dermatomes, even though sensation may be more impaired in other, higher dermatomes below the level of the lesion. Sacral sparing has been attributed to the fact that the sacral spinal pathways are not as likely as the other spinal pathways to become compressed after injury due to the lamination of fibers within the spinal cord.

=== Spinal cord injury without radiographic abnormality ===
Spinal cord injury without radiographic abnormality exists when spinal cord injury is present but there is no evidence of spinal column injury on radiographs. Spinal column injury is trauma that causes fracture of the bone or instability of the ligaments in the spine; this can coexist with or cause injury to the spinal cord, but each injury can occur without the other. Abnormalities might show up on magnetic resonance imaging (MRI), but the term was coined before MRI was in common use.

=== Central cord syndrome ===
Incomplete lesions of the spinal cord: Central cord syndrome (top), Anterior cord syndrome (middle), and Brown-Séquard syndrome (bottom)

Central cord syndrome, almost always resulting from damage to the cervical spinal cord, is characterized by weakness in the arms with relative sparing of the legs, and spared sensation in regions served by the sacral segments. There is loss of sensation of pain, temperature, light touch, and pressure below the level of injury. The spinal tracts that serve the arms are more affected due to their central location in the spinal cord, while the corticospinal fibers destined for the legs are spared due to their more external location.

The most common of the incomplete SCI syndromes, central cord syndrome usually results from neck hyperextension in older people with spinal stenosis. In younger people, it most commonly results from neck flexion. The most common causes are falls and vehicle accidents; however other possible causes include spinal stenosis and impingement on the spinal cord by a tumor or intervertebral disc.

=== Anterior spinal artery syndrome ===
Anterior spinal artery syndrome also known as anterior spinal cord syndrome, due to damage to the front portion of the spinal cord or reduction in the blood supply from the anterior spinal artery, can be caused by fractures or dislocations of vertebrae or herniated disks. Below the level of injury, motor function, pain sensation, and temperature sensation are lost, while sense of touch and proprioception (sense of position in space) remain intact. These differences are due to the relative locations of the spinal tracts responsible for each type of function.

=== Brown-Séquard syndrome ===
Brown-Séquard syndrome occurs when the spinal cord is injured on one side much more than the other. It is rare for the spinal cord to be truly hemisected (severed on one side), but partial lesions due to penetrating wounds (such as gunshot or knife wounds) or fractured vertebrae or tumors are common. On the ipsilateral side of the injury (same side), the body loses motor function, proprioception, and senses of vibration and touch. On the contralateral (opposite side) of the injury, there is a loss of pain and temperature sensations. If the injury is above pyramidal decussation there is contralateral hemiplegia, at the level of decussation there is completed motor loss on both sides and below pyramidal decussation there is ipsilateral hemiplegia.Spinothalamic tracts are in charge for pain and temperature sensation and because these tracts cross to the opposite side and above the spinal cord there is loss on the contralateral side.

=== Posterior spinal artery syndrome ===
Posterior spinal artery syndrome (PSAS), in which just the dorsal columns of the spinal cord are affected, is usually seen in cases of chronic myelopathy but can also occur with infarction of the posterior spinal artery. This rare syndrome causes the loss of proprioception and sense of vibration below the level of injury while motor function and sensation of pain, temperature, and touch remain intact. Usually posterior cord injuries result from insults like disease or vitamin deficiency rather than trauma. Tabes dorsalis, due to injury to the posterior part of the spinal cord caused by syphilis, results in loss of touch and proprioceptive sensation.

=== Conus medullaris and cauda equina syndromes ===
Conus medullaris syndrome is an injury to the end of the spinal cord the conus medullaris, located at about the T12–L2 vertebrae in adults. This region contains the S4–S5 spinal segments, responsible for bowel, bladder, and some sexual functions, so these can be disrupted in this type of injury. In addition, sensation and the Achilles reflex can be disrupted. Causes include tumors, physical trauma, and ischemia. Cauda equina syndrome may also be caused by central disc prolapse or slipped disc, infections such as epidural abscess, spinal haemorrhages, secondary to medical procedures and birth abnormalities.

Cauda equina syndrome (CES) results from a lesion below the level at which the spinal cord ends. Descending nerve roots continue as the cauda equina at levels L2–S5 below the conus medullaris before exiting through intervertebral foraminae. Thus it is not a true spinal cord syndrome since it is nerve roots that are damaged and not the cord itself; however, it is common for several of these nerves to be damaged at the same time due to their proximity. CES can occur by itself or alongside conus medullaris syndrome. It can cause low back pain, weakness or paralysis in the lower limbs, loss of sensation, bowel and bladder dysfunction, and loss of reflexes. There may be bilateral sciatica with central disc prolapse and altered gait. Unlike conus medullaris syndrome, symptoms often occur only on one side of the body. The cause is often compression, e.g. by a ruptured intervertebral disk or tumor. Since the nerves damaged in CES are actually peripheral nerves because they have already branched off from the spinal cord, the injury has better prognosis for recovery of function: the peripheral nervous system has a greater capacity for healing than the central nervous system.

== Signs and symptoms ==
Actions of the spinal nerves
Level	Motor Function
C1–C6	Neck flexors
C1–T1	Neck extensors
C3, C4, C5	Supply diaphragm (mostly C4)
C5, C6	Move shoulder, raise arm (deltoid); flex elbow (biceps)
C6	externally rotate (supinate) the arm
C6, C7	Extend elbow and wrist (triceps and wrist extensors); pronate wrist
C7, T1	Flex wrist; supply small muscles of the hand
T1–T6	Intercostals and trunk above the waist
T7–L1	Abdominal muscles
L1–L4	Flex thigh
L2, L3, L4	Adduct thigh; Extend leg at the knee (quadriceps femoris)
L4, L5, S1	abduct thigh; Flex leg at the knee (hamstrings); Dorsiflex foot (tibialis anterior); Extend toes
L5, S1, S2	Extend leg at the hip (gluteus maximus); Plantar flex foot and flex toes

Signs (observed by a clinician) and symptoms (experienced by a patient) vary depending on where the spine is injured and the extent of the injury.

=== Dermatome ===
A section of skin innervated through a specific part of the spine is called a dermatome, and injury to that part of the spine can cause pain, numbness, or a loss of sensation in the related areas. Paraesthesia, a tingling or burning sensation in affected areas of the skin, is another symptom. A person with a lowered level of consciousness may show a response to a painful stimulus above a certain point but not below it.

=== Muscle function ===
A group of muscles innervated through a specific part of the spine is called a myotome, and injury to that part of the spinal cord can cause problems with movements that involve those muscles. The muscles may contract uncontrollably (spasticity), become weak, or be completely paralysed. Spinal shock, loss of neural activity including reflexes below the level of injury, occurs shortly after the injury and usually goes away within a day. Priapism, an erection of the penis may be a sign of acute spinal cord injury.

The specific parts of the body affected by loss of function are determined by the level of injury. Some signs, such as bowel and bladder dysfunction can occur at any level. Neurogenic bladder involves a compromised ability to empty the bladder and is a common symptom of spinal cord injury. This can lead to high pressures in the bladder that can damage the kidneys.

== Spinal cord injury locations ==
=== Cervical spine ===
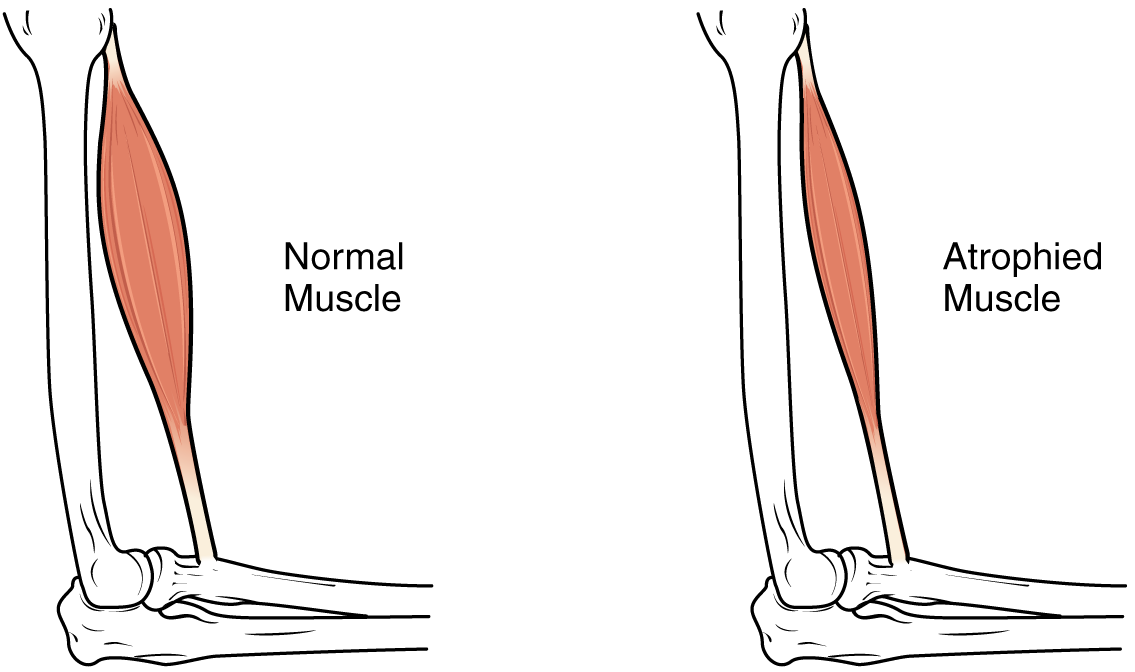
Muscle mass is reduced as muscles atrophy with disuse.

Function after complete cervical spinal cord injury
Level	Motor Function	Respiratory function
C1–C4	Full paralysis of the limbs	Cannot breathe without mechanical ventilation
C5	Paralysis of the wrists, hands, and triceps	Difficulty coughing; may need help clearing secretions
C6	Paralysis of the wrist flexors, triceps, and hands	Difficulty coughing; may need help clearing secretions
C7–C8	Some hand muscle weakness, difficulty grasping and releasing	Difficulty coughing; may need help clearing secretions

Spinal cord injuries at the cervical vertebrae (neck) level result in full or partial tetraplegia, also called quadriplegia. Depending on the specific location and severity of trauma, limited function may be retained. Additional symptoms of cervical injuries include low heart rate, low blood pressure, problems regulating body temperature, and breathing dysfunction. If the injury is high enough in the neck to impair the muscles involved in breathing, the person may not be able to breathe without the help of an endotracheal tube and mechanical ventilator.

=== Lumbosacral ===
The effects of injuries at or above the lumbar or sacral regions of the spinal cord (lower back and pelvis) include decreased control of the legs and hips, genitourinary system, and anus. People injured below level L2 may still have use of their hip flexor and knee extensor muscles. Bowel and bladder function are regulated by the sacral region. It is common to experience sexual dysfunction after injury, as well as dysfunction of the bowel and bladder, including fecal and urinary incontinence.

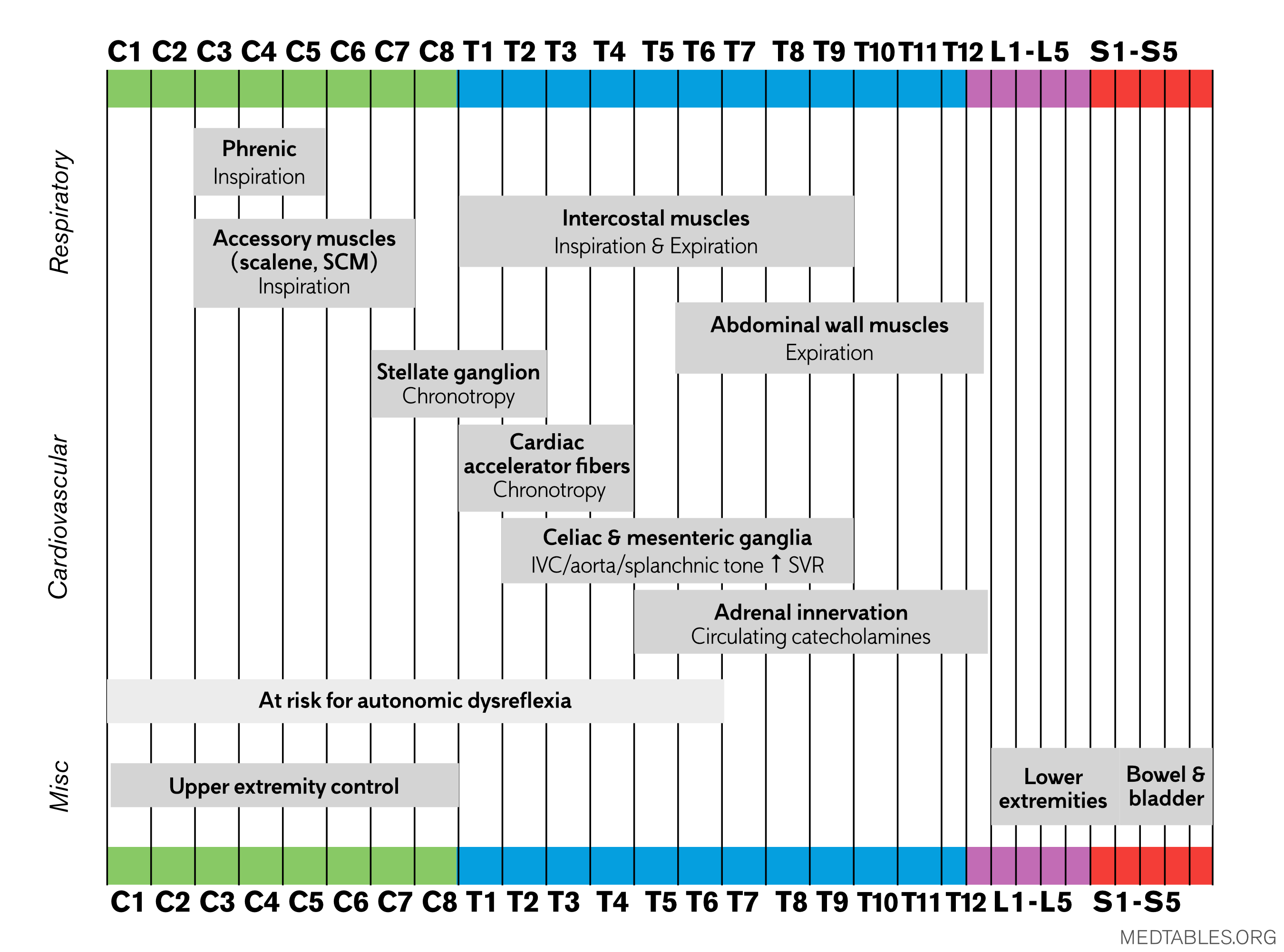
Expected spinal cord injury complications by level of injury.

=== Thoracic ===
In addition to the problems found in lower-level injuries, thorax (chest height) spinal lesions can affect the muscles in the trunk. Injuries at the level of T1 to T8 result in inability to control the abdominal muscles. Trunk stability may be affected; even more so in higher level injuries. The lower the level of injury, the less extensive its effects. Injuries from T9 to T12 result in partial loss of trunk and abdominal muscle control. Thoracic spinal injuries result in paraplegia, but function of the hands, arms, and neck are not affected.

==== Autonomic dysreflexia ====
One condition that occurs typically in lesions above the T6 level is autonomic dysreflexia (AD), in which the blood pressure increases to dangerous levels, high enough to cause potentially deadly stroke. It results from an overreaction of the system to a stimulus such as pain below the level of injury, because inhibitory signals from the brain cannot pass the lesion to dampen the excitatory sympathetic nervous system response. Signs and symptoms of AD include anxiety, headache, nausea, ringing in the ears, blurred vision, flushed skin, and nasal congestion. It can occur shortly after the injury or not until years later.

Other autonomic functions may also be disrupted. For example, problems with body temperature regulation mostly occur in injuries at T8 and above.

==== Neurogenic shock ====
Another serious complication that can result from lesions above T6 is neurogenic shock, which results from an interruption in output from the sympathetic nervous system responsible for maintaining muscle tone in the blood vessels. Without the sympathetic input, the vessels relax and dilate. Neurogenic shock presents with dangerously low blood pressure, low heart rate, and blood pooling in the limbs—which results in insufficient blood flow to the spinal cord and potentially further damage to it.

== Complications ==
Complications of spinal cord injuries include pulmonary edema, respiratory failure, neurogenic shock, and paralysis below the injury site.

=== Muscle atrophy ===
In the long term, the loss of muscle function can have additional effects from disuse, including muscle atrophy. Immobility also can lead to pressure sores, particularly in bony areas, requiring precautions such as extra cushioning and turning in bed every two hours (in the acute setting) to relieve pressure.

In the long term, people in wheelchairs must shift periodically to relieve pressure. Another complication is pain, including nociceptive pain (indication of potential or actual tissue damage) and neuropathic pain, when nerves affected by damage convey erroneous pain signals in the absence of noxious stimuli. Spasticity, the uncontrollable tensing of muscles below the level of injury, occurs in 65–78% of chronic SCI. It results from lack of input from the brain that quells muscle responses to stretch reflexes. It can be treated with drugs and physical therapy. Spasticity increases the risk of contractures (shortening of muscles, tendons, or ligaments that result from lack of use of a limb); this problem can be prevented by moving the limb through its full range of motion multiple times a day. Another problem lack of mobility can cause is loss of bone density and changes in bone structure. Loss of bone density (bone demineralization), thought to be due to lack of input from weakened or paralysed muscles, can increase the risk of fractures. Conversely, a poorly understood phenomenon is the overgrowth of bone tissue in soft tissue areas, called heterotopic ossification. It occurs below the level of injury, possibly as a result of inflammation, and happens to a clinically significant extent in 27% of people.

=== Cardiovascular and respiratory complications ===
People with spinal cord injury are at especially high risk for respiratory and cardiovascular problems, so hospital staff must be watchful to avoid them. Respiratory problems (especially pneumonia) are the leading cause of death in people with SCI, followed by infections, usually of pressure sores, urinary tract infections, and respiratory infections. Pneumonia can be accompanied by shortness of breath, fever, and anxiety.

=== Deep venous thrombosis ===
Another potentially deadly threat to respiration is deep venous thrombosis (DVT), in which blood forms a clot in immobile limbs; the clot can break off and form a pulmonary embolism, lodging in the lung and cutting off blood supply to it. DVT is an especially high risk in SCI, particularly within 10 days of injury, occurring in over 13% in the acute care setting. Preventative measures include anticoagulants, pressure hose, and moving the patient's limbs. The usual signs and symptoms of DVT and pulmonary embolism may be masked in SCI cases due to effects such as alterations in pain perception and nervous system functioning.

=== Urinary tract infection ===
Urinary tract infection (UTI) is another risk that may not display the usual symptoms (pain, urgency, and frequency); it may instead be associated with worsened spasticity. The risk of UTI, likely the most common complication in the long term, is heightened by use of indwelling urinary catheters. Catheterization may be necessary because SCI interferes with the bladder's ability to empty when it gets too full, which could trigger autonomic dysreflexia or damage the bladder permanently. The use of intermittent catheterization to empty the bladder at regular intervals throughout the day has decreased the mortality due to kidney failure from UTI in the first world, but it is still a serious problem in developing countries.

=== Clinical depression ===
An estimated 24–45% of people with spinal cord injuries have major depressive disorder, and the suicide rate is as much as six times that of the rest of the population. The risk of suicide is worst in the first five years after injury. In young people with SCI, suicide is the leading cause of death. Depression is associated with an increased risk of other complications such as UTI and pressure ulcers that occur more when self-care is neglected.

=== Neurogenic heterotopic ossification ===
Neurogenic heterotopic ossification (NHO) are extra-skeletal lamellar bones forming around joints most frequently hip, knee, shoulder and elbow in descending order of incidence. NHO is one of the most frequent musculoskeletal complications of severe spinal cord injuries with reported incidence varying from 0.5 % to 53% but generally the reported incidence is between 6 and 25%. Recent metanalyses have reported significant association with severity and completeness of the SCI, spasticity, presence of infections, presence of hip-pelvic trauma.

The underlying mechanism by which NHO forms is not fully understood but has been studied in a mouse model of SCI-induced NHO. Neurogenic heterotopic ossficiation is thought to be caused by abnormal muscle repair following trauma. During normal muscle repair, muscle stem cells divide and differentiate to regenerate muscle fibres. This process is controlled by inflammatory cells and supports muscle cell growth. A key step during normal muscle repair is the programmed cell death (apoptosis) triggered inflammatory cells to prevent the development of muscle fibrosis. However, following a spinal cord injury, fibro-adipogenic progenitors fail to undergo apoptosis and instead accumulate and differentiate into bone forming osteoblasts. The spinal cord injury stimulates the adrenal glands to release the glucocorticoid corticosterone into the circulation. Excessive corticosterone causes an exaggerated inflammation response in the injured muscle with excessive release of oncostatin M and interleukin-1β. Oncostatin M and interleukin-1 bind to their cognate receptors OSMR and IL1R1 expressed by muscle fibro-adipogenic progenitors which in turn promote their proliferation and osteogenic differentiation. In support of this model, treatment with glucocorticoid receptor antagonists such as mifepristone or relacorilant or conditional deletion of the glucocorticoid receptor gene strongly inhibit the development of NHO after SCI in this mouse model. Treatment with ruxolitinib, an inhibitor of JAK1 and JAK2 tyrosine kinases, which are activated downstream of OSMR, also reduces NHO in this model. This mechanism also explains why infections, particularly with gram-negative bacteria, are associated with higher incidence of NHO in victims of traumatic brain and spinal cord injuries. Lipopolysaccharides from gram-negative bacteria worsen NHO by binding to their receptor Toll-like receptor 4 expressed by macrophages and muscle fibro-adipogenic progenitors and further increase oncostatin M and interleukin-1β release by macrophages. Additional pathogen-associated molecular patterns produced by bacteria and viruses such as lipopeptides and double stranded RNA have been found to exacerbate NHO development after spinal cord injury.

== Causes ==
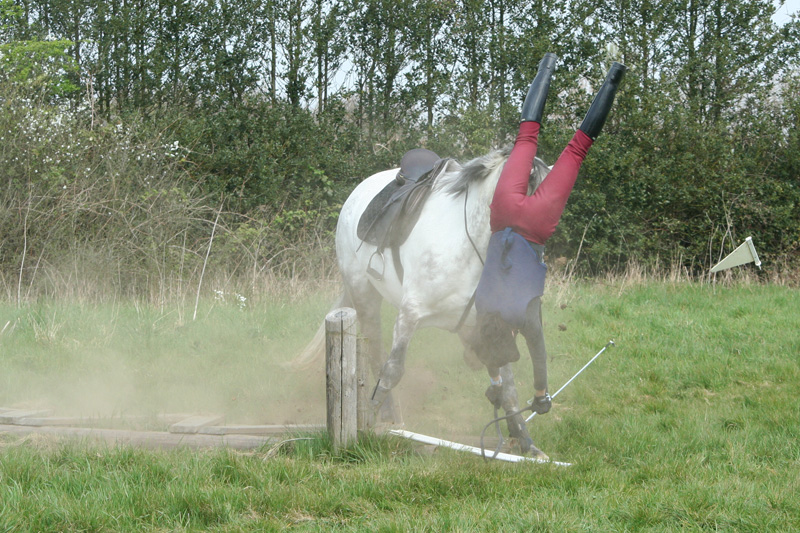
Falling as a part of recreational activities can cause spinal cord injuries.

Spinal cord injuries are most often caused by physical trauma. Forces involved can be hyperflexion (forward movement of the head); hyperextension (backward movement); lateral stress (sideways movement); rotation (twisting of the head); compression (force along the axis of the spine downward from the head or upward from the pelvis); or distraction (pulling apart of the vertebrae). Traumatic SCI can result in contusion, compression, or stretch injury. It is a major risk of many types of vertebral fracture. Pre-existing asymptomatic congenital anomalies can cause major neurological deficits, such as hemiparesis, to result from otherwise minor trauma.

In the U.S., motor vehicle accidents are the most common cause of SCIs; second are falls, then violence such as gunshot wounds, then sports injuries. Another study from Asia, found that the most common cause of the SCI is fall (31.70%) from various sites such as fall from roof-tops (9.75%), electric pole (7.31%), fall from tree (7.31%) etc. Whereas road traffic accidents count for 19.51%, firearm injuries (12.19%), slipped foot (7.31%) and sports injuries (4.87%). As a result of injury, 26.82%In some countries falls are more common, even surpassing vehicle crashes as the leading cause of SCI. The rates of violence-related SCI depend heavily on place and time. Of all sports-related SCIs, shallow water dives are the most common cause; winter sports and water sports have been increasing as causes while association football and trampoline injuries have been declining. Hanging can cause injury to the cervical spine, as may occur in attempted suicide. Military conflicts are another cause, and when they occur they are associated with increased rates of SCI. Another potential cause of SCI is iatrogenic injury, caused by an improperly done medical procedure such as an injection into the spinal column.

SCI can also be of a nontraumatic origin. The percentage varies by locale, influenced by efforts to prevent trauma. Developed countries have higher percentages of SCI due to degenerative conditions and tumors than developing countries. In developed countries, the most common cause of nontraumatic SCI is degenerative diseases, followed by tumors; in many developing countries the leading cause is infection such as HIV and tuberculosis. SCI may occur in intervertebral disc disease, and spinal cord vascular disease. Spontaneous bleeding can occur within or outside of the protective membranes that line the cord, and intervertebral disks can herniate. Damage can result from dysfunction of the blood vessels, as in arteriovenous malformation, or when a blood clot becomes lodged in a blood vessel and cuts off blood supply to the cord. When systemic blood pressure drops, blood flow to the spinal cord may be reduced, potentially causing a loss of sensation and voluntary movement in the areas supplied by the affected level of the spinal cord. Congenital conditions and tumors that compress the cord can also cause SCI, as can vertebral spondylosis and ischemia. Multiple sclerosis is a disease that can damage the spinal cord, as can infectious or inflammatory conditions such as tuberculosis, herpes zoster or herpes simplex, meningitis, myelitis, and syphilis.

== Prevention ==
Vehicle-related spinal cord injury is prevented with measures including societal and individual efforts to reduce driving under the influence of drugs or alcohol, distracted driving, and drowsy driving. Other efforts include increasing road safety (such as marking hazards and adding lighting) and vehicle safety, both to prevent accidents, such as routine maintenance and anti-lock brakes. There are also approaches mitigate the damage of crashes, such as head restraints, air bags, seat belts, and child safety seats. Falls can be prevented by making changes to the environment, such as nonslip materials and grab bars in bathtubs and showers, railings for stairs, child and safety gates for windows. Gun-related injuries can be prevented with conflict resolution training, gun safety education campaigns, and changes to the technology of guns, including trigger locks to improve their safety. Sports injuries can be prevented with changes to sports rules and equipment to increase safety, and education campaigns to reduce risky practices such as diving into water of unknown depth or head-first tackling in association football.

== Diagnosis ==
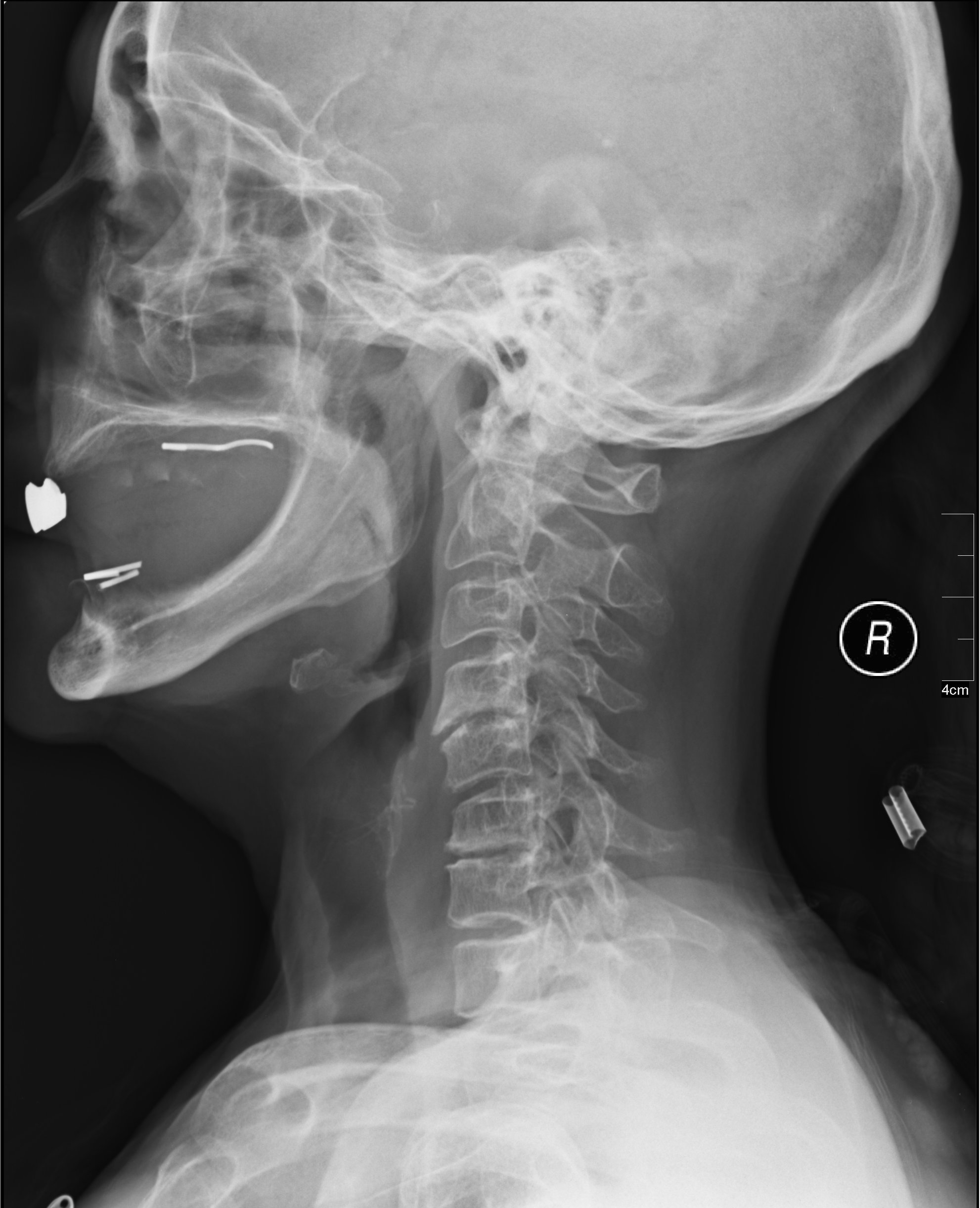
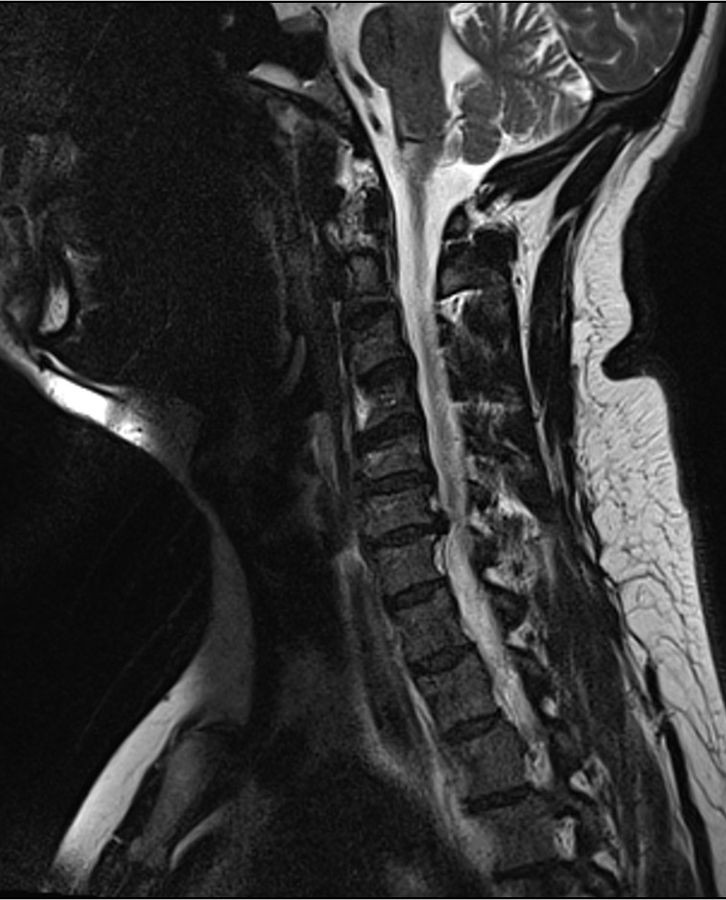
X-rays (left) are more available, but can miss details like herniated disks that MRIs can show (right).

A person's presentation in context of trauma or non-traumatic background determines suspicion for a spinal cord injury. The features are namely paralysis, sensory loss, or both at any level. Other symptoms may include incontinence.

A radiographic evaluation using an X-ray, CT scan, or MRI can determine if there is damage to the spinal column and where it is located. X-rays are commonly available and can detect instability or misalignment of the spinal column, but do not give very detailed images and can miss injuries to the spinal cord or displacement of ligaments or disks that do not have accompanying spinal column damage. Thus when X-ray findings are normal but SCI is still suspected due to pain or SCI symptoms, CT or MRI scans are used. CT gives greater detail than X-rays, but exposes the patient to more radiation, and it still does not give images of the spinal cord or ligaments; MRI shows body structures in the greatest detail. Thus it is the standard for anyone who has neurological deficits found in SCI or is thought to have an unstable spinal column injury.

Neurological evaluations to help determine the degree of impairment are performed initially and repeatedly in the early stages of treatment; this determines the rate of improvement or deterioration and informs treatment and prognosis. The ASIA Impairment Scale outlined above is used to determine the level and severity of injury.

== Management ==
=== Pre-hospital treatment ===
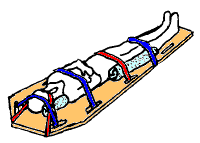
Spinal precaution with use of a long spinal board

The first stage in the management of a suspected spinal cord injury is geared toward basic life support and preventing further injury: maintaining airway, breathing, circulation, and restricting further motion of the spine.

==== Spinal motion restriction ====
In the emergency setting, most people who have been subjected to forces strong enough to cause SCI are treated as though they have instability in the spinal column and have spinal motion restricted to prevent damage to the spinal cord. Injuries or fractures in the head, neck, or pelvis as well as penetrating trauma near the spine and falls from heights are assumed to be associated with an unstable spinal column until it is ruled out in the hospital. High-speed vehicle crashes, sports injuries involving the head or neck, and diving injuries are other mechanisms that indicate a high SCI risk. Since head and spinal trauma frequently coexist, anyone who is unconscious or has a lowered level of consciousness as a result of a head injury is spinal motion restricted.

==== Devices ====
A rigid cervical collar is applied to the neck, and the head is held with blocks on either side and the person is strapped to a backboard. Extrication devices are used to move people without excessively moving the spine if they are still inside a vehicle or other confined space. The use of a cervical collar has been shown to increase mortality in people with penetrating trauma and is thus not routinely recommended in this group.

Modern trauma care includes a step called clearing the cervical spine, ruling out spinal cord injury if the patient is fully conscious and not under the influence of drugs or alcohol, displays no neurological deficits, has no pain in the middle of the neck and no other painful injuries that could distract from neck pain. If these are all absent, no spinal motion restriction is necessary.

If an unstable spinal column injury is moved, damage may occur to the spinal cord. Between 3 and 25% of SCIs occur not at the time of the initial trauma but later during treatment or transport. While some of this is due to the nature of the injury itself, particularly in the case of multiple or massive trauma, some of it reflects the failure to adequately restrict motion of the spine. SCI can impair the body's ability to keep warm, so warming blankets may be needed.

=== Early hospital treatment ===
Initial care in the hospital, as in the prehospital setting, aims to ensure adequate airway, breathing, cardiovascular function, and spinal motion restriction. Imaging of the spine to determine the presence of a SCI may need to wait if emergency surgery is needed to stabilize other life-threatening injuries. Acute SCI merits treatment in an intensive care unit, especially injuries to the cervical spinal cord. People with SCI need repeated neurological assessments and treatment by neurosurgeons. People should be removed from the spine board as rapidly as possible to prevent complications from its use.

==== Blood pressure ====
If the systolic blood pressure falls below 90 mmHg within days of the injury, blood supply to the spinal cord may be reduced, resulting in further damage. Thus it is important to maintain the blood pressure which may be done using intravenous fluids and vasopressors. Vasopressors used include phenylephrine, dopamine, or norepinephrine. Mean arterial blood pressure is measured and kept at 85 to 90 mmHg for seven days after injury.

The CAMPER Trial led by Dr Kwon and subsequent studies by the UCSF TRACK-SCI group (Dhall) have shown that spinal cord perfusion pressure (SCPP) goals are more closely associated with better neurologic recovery than MAP goals. Some institutions have adopted these SCPP goals and lumbar CSF drain placement as a standard of care. The treatment for shock from blood loss is different from that for neurogenic shock, and could harm people with the latter type, so it is necessary to determine why someone is in shock. However it is also possible for both causes to exist at the same time. Another important aspect of care is prevention of insufficient oxygen in the bloodstream, which could deprive the spinal cord of oxygen. People with cervical or high thoracic injuries may experience a dangerously slowed heart rate; treatment to speed it may include atropine.

==== Steroid treatment ====
The corticosteroid medication methylprednisolone has been studied for use in spinal cord injury patients with the hope of limiting swelling and secondary injury. As there does not appear to be long term benefits and the medication is associated with risks such as gastrointestinal bleeding and infection its use is not recommended as of 2018. Its use in traumatic brain injury is also not recommended.

==== Surgery ====
Surgery may be necessary, e.g. to relieve excess pressure on the cord, to stabilize the spine, or to put vertebrae back in their proper place. In cases involving instability or compression, failing to operate can lead to worsening of the condition. Surgery is also necessary when something is pressing on the cord, such as bone fragments, blood, material from ligaments or intervertebral discs, or a lodged object from a penetrating injury. Although the ideal timing of surgery is still debated, studies have found that earlier surgical intervention (within 12 hours of injury) is associated with better outcomes. This type of surgery is often referred to as "Ultra-Early", coined by Burke et al. at UCSF. Sometimes a patient has too many other injuries to be a surgical candidate this early. Surgery is controversial because it has potential complications (such as infection), so in cases where it is not clearly needed (e.g. the cord is being compressed), doctors must decide whether to perform surgery based on aspects of the patient's condition and their own beliefs about its risks and benefits. Recent large-scale studies have shown that patients who do undergo earlier surgery (within 12–24 hours) experience significantly lower rates of life-threatening complications and spend less time in hospital and critical care.

However, in cases where a more conservative approach is chosen, bed rest, cervical collars, motion restriction devices, and optionally traction are used. Surgeons may opt to put traction on the spine to remove pressure from the spinal cord by putting dislocated vertebrae back into alignment, but herniation of intervertebral disks may prevent this technique from relieving pressure. Gardner-Wells tongs are one tool used to exert spinal traction to reduce a fracture or dislocation and to reduce motion to the affected areas.

=== Rehabilitation ===
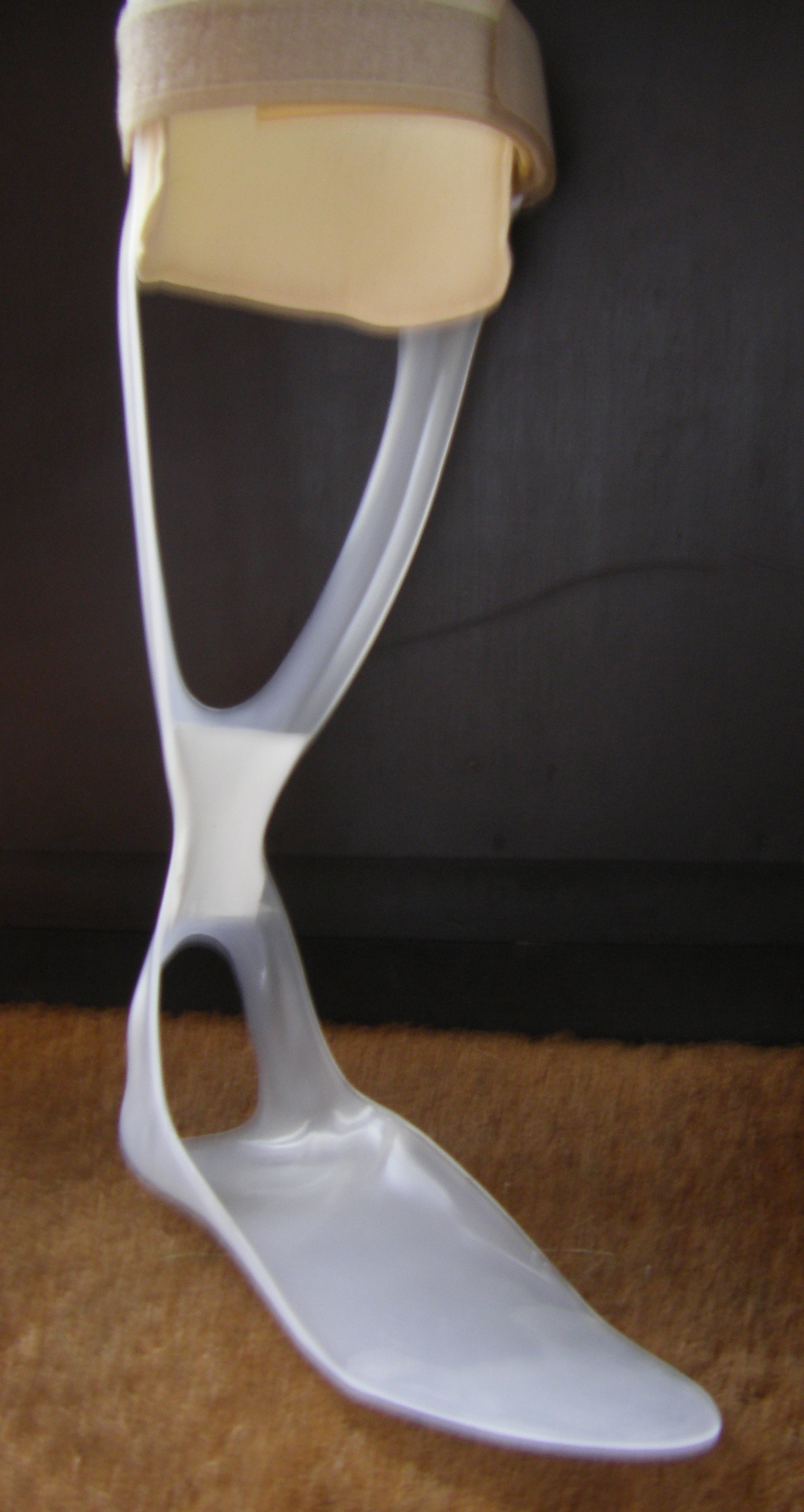
A drop foot orthosis lifts the forefoot in order to compensate for a weakness in the dorsiflexors. If other muscle groups, such as the plantar flexors, are weak, additional functional elements must be considered. An ankle-foot orthoses (AFO) is not suitable for the care of patients with weakness in other muscle groups.

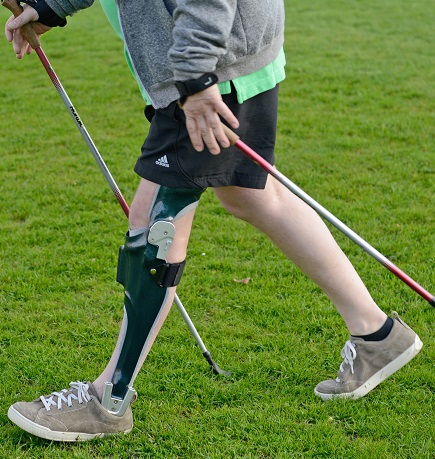
A patient after incomplete paraplegia (lesion height L3) with a knee-ankle-foot orthosis (KAFO) with an integrated stance phase control knee joint

Spinal cord injury patients often require extended treatment in specialized spinal unit or an intensive care unit. The rehabilitation process typically begins in the acute care setting. Usually, the inpatient phase lasts 8–12 weeks and then the outpatient rehabilitation phase lasts 3–12 months after that, followed by yearly medical and functional evaluation. Physical therapists, occupational therapists, recreational therapists, nurses, social workers, psychologists, and other health care professionals work as a team under the coordination of a physiatrist to decide on goals with the patient and develop a plan of discharge that is appropriate for the person's condition.

In the acute phase physical therapists focus on the patient's respiratory status, prevention of indirect complications (such as pressure ulcers), maintaining range of motion, and keeping available musculature active.

For people whose injuries are high enough to interfere with breathing, there is great emphasis on airway clearance during this stage of recovery. Weakness of respiratory muscles impairs the ability to cough effectively, allowing secretions to accumulate within the lungs. As SCI patients have reduced total lung capacity and tidal volume, physical therapists teach them accessory breathing techniques (e.g. apical breathing, glossopharyngeal breathing) that typically are not taught to healthy individuals. Physical therapy treatment for airway clearance may include manual percussions and vibrations, postural drainage, respiratory muscle training, and assisted cough techniques. Patients are taught to increase their intra-abdominal pressure by leaning forward to induce cough and clear mild secretions. The quad cough technique is done lying on the back with the therapist applying pressure on the abdomen in the rhythm of the cough to maximize expiratory flow and mobilize secretions. Manual abdominal compression is another technique used to increase expiratory flow which later improves coughing. Other techniques used to manage respiratory dysfunction include respiratory muscle pacing, use of a constricting abdominal binder, ventilator-assisted speech, and mechanical ventilation.

The amount of functional recovery and independence achieved in terms of activities of daily living, recreational activities, and employment is affected by the level and severity of injury. The Functional Independence Measure (FIM) is an assessment tool that aims to evaluate the function of patients throughout the rehabilitation process following a spinal cord injury or other serious illness or injury. It can track a patient's progress and degree of independence during rehabilitation. People with SCI may need to use specialized devices and to make modifications to their environment in order to handle activities of daily living and to function independently. Weak joints can be stabilized with devices such as ankle-foot orthoses (AFOs) or knee-ankle-foot orthoses (KAFOs), but walking may still require a lot of effort. Increasing activity will increase chances of recovery.

For treatment of paralysis levels in the lower thoracic spine or lower, starting therapy with an orthosis is promising from the intermediate phase (2–26 weeks after the incident). In patients with complete paraplegia (ASIA A), this applies to lesion heights between T12 and S5. In patients with incomplete paraplegia (ASIA B-D), orthoses are even suitable for lesion heights above T12. In both cases, however, a detailed muscle function test must be carried out to precisely plan the construction with an orthosis.

== Prognosis ==
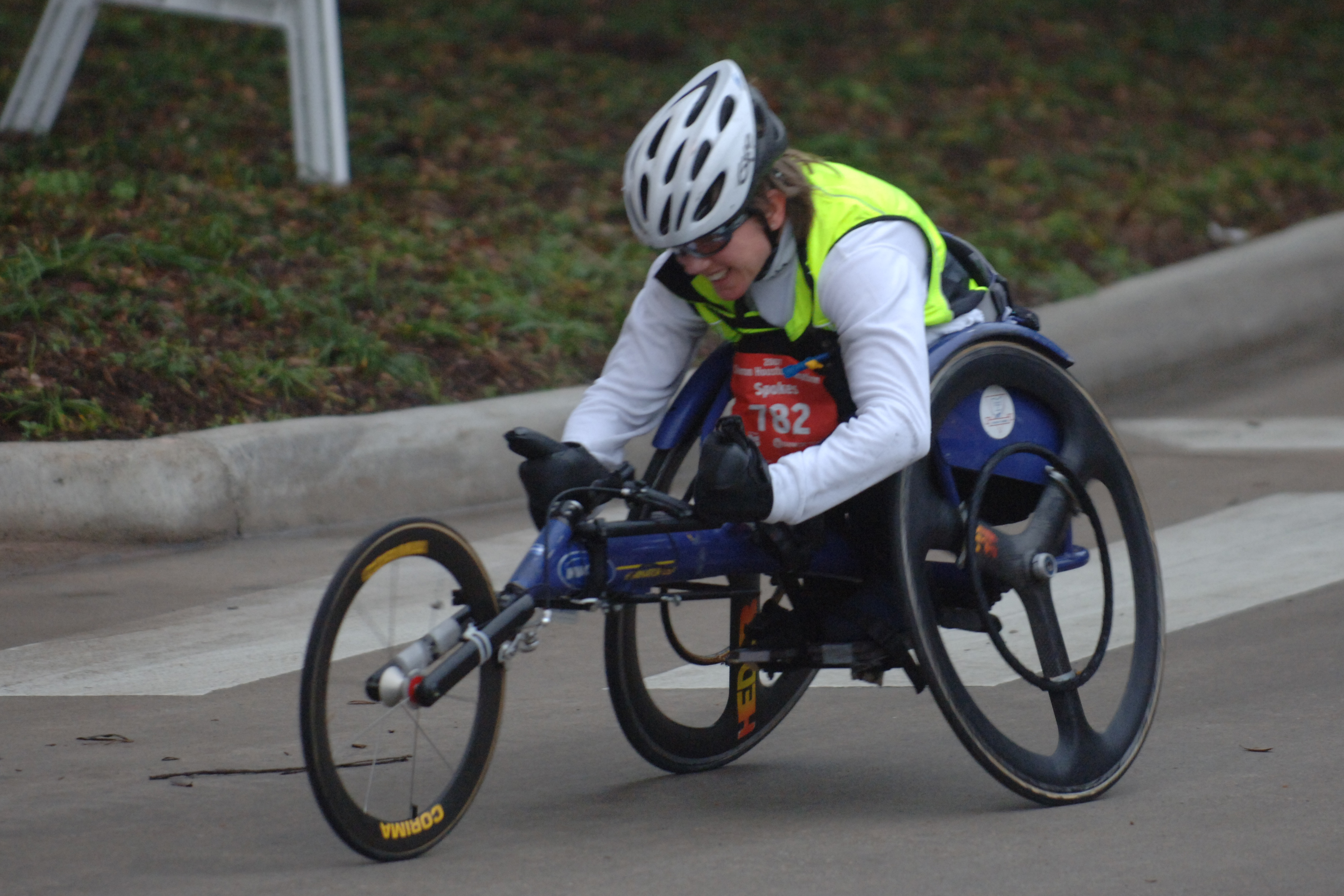
Holly Koester, who incurred a spinal injury as a result of a motor vehicle collision, is now a wheelchair racer.

Spinal cord injuries generally result in at least some incurable impairment even with the best possible treatment. The best predictor of prognosis is the level and completeness of injury, as measured by the ASIA impairment scale. The neurological score at the initial evaluation done 72 hours after injury is the best predictor of how much function will return. Most people with ASIA scores of A (complete injuries) do not have functional motor recovery, but improvement can occur. Most patients with incomplete injuries recover at least some function. Chances of recovering the ability to walk improve with each AIS grade found at the initial examination; e.g. an ASIA D score confers a better chance of walking than a score of C. The symptoms of incomplete injuries can vary and it is difficult to make an accurate prediction of the outcome. A person with a mild, incomplete injury at the T5 vertebra will have a much better chance of using his or her legs than a person with a severe, complete injury at exactly the same place. Of the incomplete SCI syndromes, Brown-Séquard and central cord syndromes have the best prognosis for recovery and anterior cord syndrome has the worst.

People with nontraumatic causes of SCI have been found to be less likely to develop complete injuries and some complications such as pressure sores and deep vein thrombosis, and to have shorter hospital stays. Their scores on functional tests were better than those of people with traumatic SCI upon hospital admission, but when they were tested upon discharge, those with traumatic SCI had improved such that both groups' results were the same. In addition to the completeness and level of the injury, age and concurrent health problems affect the extent to which a person with SCI will be able to live independently and to walk. However, in general people with injuries to L3 or below will likely be able to walk functionally, T10 and below to walk around the house with bracing, and C7 and below to live independently. New therapies are beginning to provide hope for better outcomes in patients with SCI, but most are in the experimental/translational stage.

One important predictor of motor recovery in an area is presence of sensation there, particularly pain perception. Most motor recovery occurs in the first year post-injury, but modest improvements can continue for years; sensory recovery is more limited. Recovery is typically quickest during the first six months. Spinal shock, in which reflexes are suppressed, occurs immediately after the injury and resolves largely within three months but continues resolving gradually for another 15.

Sexual dysfunction after spinal injury is common. Problems that can occur include erectile dysfunction, loss of ability to ejaculate, insufficient lubrication of the vagina, and reduced sensation and impaired ability to orgasm. Despite this, many people learn ways to adapt their sexual practices so they can lead satisfying sex lives.

Although life expectancy has improved with better care options, it is still not as good as the uninjured population. The higher the level of injury, and the more complete the injury, the greater the reduction in life expectancy. Mortality is very elevated within a year of injury.

== Epidemiology ==
Breakdown of age at time of injury in the US from 1995–1999.
1. 0–15 (3.00%)
2. 16–30 (42.1%)
3. 31–45 (28.1%)
4. 46–60 (15.1%)
5. 61–75 (8.50%)
6. 76+ (3.20%)

Worldwide, the number of new cases since 1995 of SCI ranges from 10.4 to 83 people per million per year. This wide range of numbers is probably partly due to differences among regions in whether and how injuries are reported. In North America, about 39 people per every million incur SCI traumatically each year, and in Western Europe, the incidence is 16 per million. In the United States, the incidence of spinal cord injury has been estimated to be about 40 cases per 1 million people per year or around 12,000 cases per year. In China, the incidence is approximately 60,000 per year.

The estimated number of people living with SCI in the world ranges from 236 to 4187 per million. Estimates vary widely due to differences in how data are collected and what techniques are used to extrapolate the figures. Little information is available from Asia, and even less from Africa and South America. In Western Europe the estimated prevalence is 300 per million people and in North America it is 853 per million. It is estimated at 440 per million in Iran, 526 per million in Iceland, and 681 per million in Australia. In the United States there are between 225,000 and 296,000 individuals living with spinal cord injuries, and different studies have estimated prevalences from 525 to 906 per million.

SCI is present in about 2% of all cases of blunt force trauma. Anyone who has undergone force sufficient to cause a thoracic spinal injury is at high risk for other injuries also. In 44% of SCI cases, other serious injuries are sustained at the same time; 14% of SCI patients also have head trauma or facial trauma. Other commonly associated injuries include chest trauma, abdominal trauma, pelvic fractures, and long bone fractures.

Males account for four out of five traumatic spinal cord injuries. Most of these injuries occur in men under 30 years of age. The average age at the time of injury has slowly increased from about 29 years in the 1970s to 41. In Pakistan, spinal cord injury is more common in males (92.68%) as compared to females in the 20–30 years of age group with a median age of 40 years, although people from 12 to 70 years of age suffered from spinal cord injury Rates of injury are at their lowest in children, at their highest in the late teens to early twenties, then get progressively lower in older age groups; however rates may rise in the elderly. In Sweden between 50 and 70% of all cases of SCI occur in people under 30, and 25% occur in those over 50. While SCI rates are highest among people age 15–20, fewer than 3% of SCIs occur in people under 15. Neonatal SCI occurs in one in 60,000 births, e.g. from breech births or injuries by forceps. The difference in rates between the sexes diminishes in injuries at age 3 and younger; the same number of girls are injured as boys, or possibly more. Another cause of pediatric injury is child abuse such as shaken baby syndrome. For children, the most common cause of SCI (56%) is vehicle crashes. High numbers of adolescent injuries are attributable in a large part to traffic accidents and sports injuries. For people over 65, falls are the most common cause of traumatic SCI. The elderly and people with severe arthritis are at high risk for SCI because of defects in the spinal column. In nontraumatic SCI, the gender difference is smaller, the average age of occurrence is greater, and incomplete lesions are more common.

== History ==
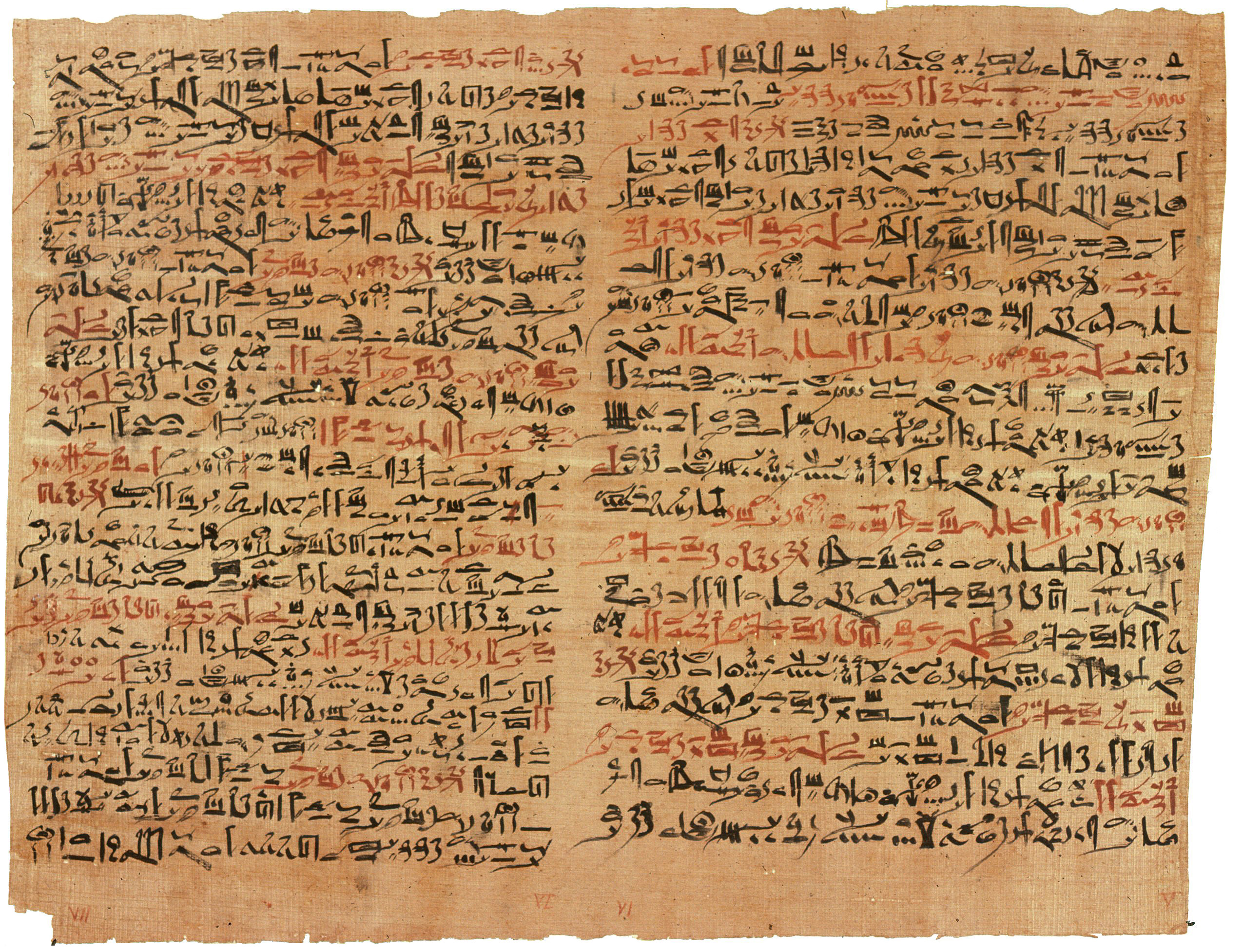
The ancient Egyptian Edwin Smith Papyrus, who provided the earliest known description of spinal cord injury

Spinal cord injury has been known to be devastating for millennia; the ancient Egyptian Edwin Smith Papyrus from 2500 BC, the first known description of the injury, says it is "not to be treated". Hindu texts dating back to 1800 BC also mention SCI and describe traction techniques to straighten the spine. The Greek physician Hippocrates, born in the fifth century BC, described SCI in his Hippocratic Corpus and invented traction devices to straighten dislocated vertebrae. But it was not until Aulus Cornelius Celsus, born 30 BC, noted that a cervical injury resulted in rapid death that the spinal cord itself was implicated in the condition. In the second century AD the Greek physician Galen experimented on monkeys and reported that a horizontal cut through the spinal cord caused them to lose all sensation and motion below the level of the cut. The seventh-century Greek physician Paul of Aegina described surgical techniques for treatment of broken vertebrae by removing bone fragments, as well as surgery to relieve pressure on the spine. Little medical progress was made during the Middle Ages in Europe; it was not until the Renaissance that the spine and nerves were accurately depicted in human anatomy drawings by Leonardo da Vinci and Andreas Vesalius.

In 1762, Andre Louis, a surgeon, removed a bullet from the lumbar spine of a patient, who regained motion in the legs. In 1829, Gilpin Smith, a surgeon, performed a successful laminectomy that improved the patient's sensation. However, the idea that SCI was untreatable remained predominant until the early 20th century. In 1934, the mortality rate in the first two years after injury was over 80%, mostly due to infections of the urinary tract and pressure sores, the latter of which were believed to be intrinsic to SCI rather than a result of continuous bedrest. It was not until the second half of the century that breakthroughs in imaging, surgery, medical care, and rehabilitation medicine contributed to a substantial improvement in SCI care. The relative incidence of incomplete compared to complete injuries has improved since the mid-20th century, due mainly to the emphasis on faster and better initial care and stabilization of spinal cord injury patients. The creation of emergency medical services to professionally transport people to the hospital is given partial credit for an improvement in outcomes since the 1970s. Improvements in care have been accompanied by increased life expectancy of people with SCI; survival times have improved by about 2000% since 1940. In 2015/2016 23% of people in nine spinal injury centres in England had their discharge delayed because of disputes about who should pay for the equipment they needed.

== Research directions ==
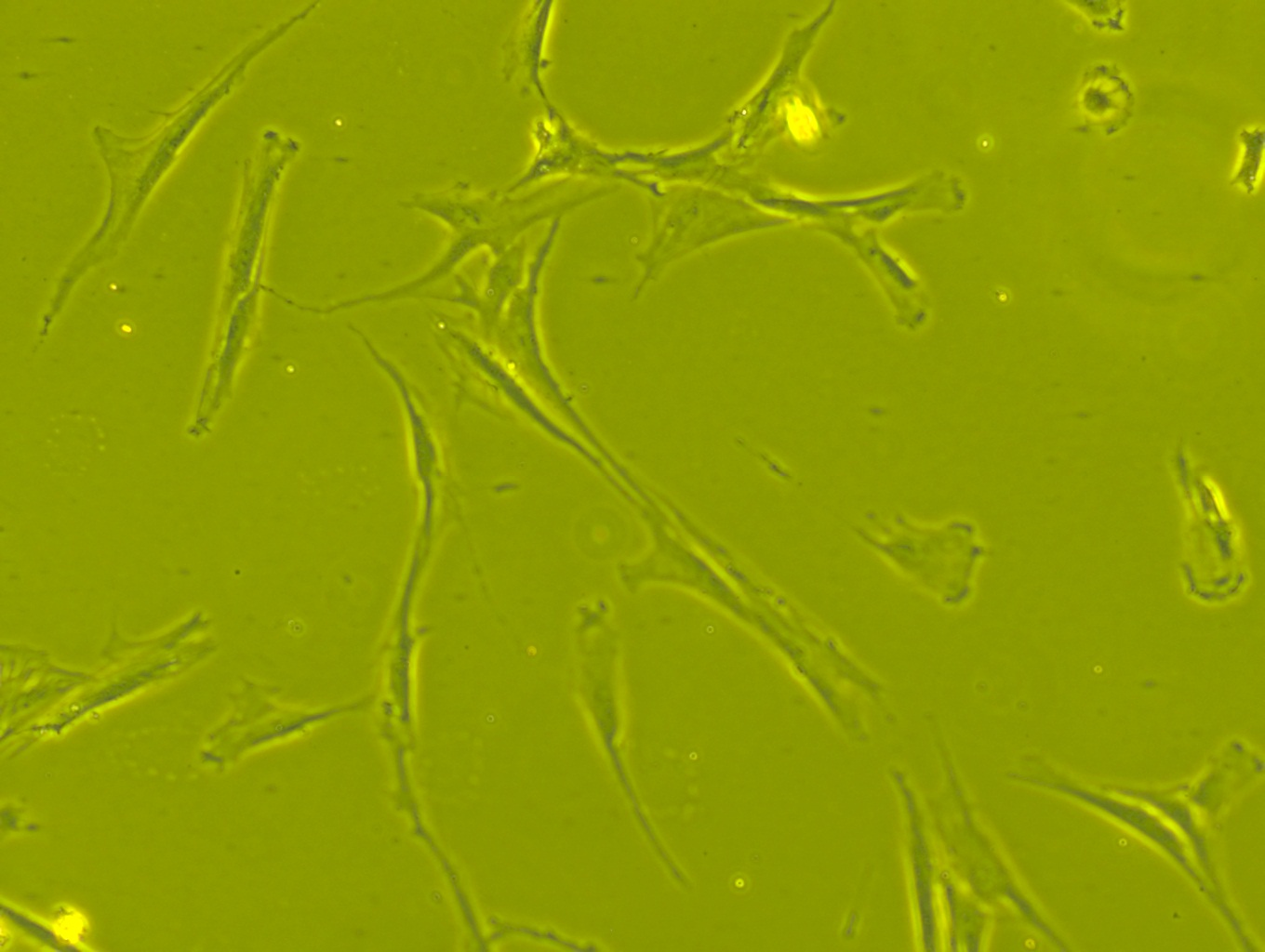
Human bone marrow derived mesenchymal stem cells seen under phase contrast microscope at 63-times magnification)

Scientists are investigating various avenues for treatment of spinal cord injury. Therapeutic research is focused on two main areas: neuroprotection and neuroregeneration. The former seeks to prevent the harm that occurs from secondary injury in the minutes to weeks following the insult, and the latter aims to reconnect the broken circuits in the spinal cord to allow function to return. Neuroprotective drugs target secondary injury effects including inflammation, damage by free radicals, excitotoxicity (neuronal damage by excessive glutamate signaling), and apoptosis (cell suicide). Several potentially neuroprotective agents that target pathways like these are under investigation in human clinical trials.

Stem cell transplantation is an important avenue for SCI research: the goal is to replace lost spinal cord cells, allow reconnection in broken neural circuits by regrowing axons, and to create an environment in the tissues that is favorable to growth. A key avenue of SCI research is research on stem cells, which can differentiate into other types of cells—including those lost after SCI. Types of cells being researched for use in SCI include embryonic stem cells, neural stem cells, mesenchymal stem cells, olfactory ensheathing cells, Schwann cells, activated macrophages, and induced pluripotent stem cells. Hundreds of stem cell studies have been done in humans, with promising but inconclusive results. An ongoing Phase 2 trial in 2016 presented data showing that after 90 days, 2 out of 4 subjects had already improved two motor levels and had thus already achieved its endpoint of 2/5 patients improving two levels within 6–12 months. Six-month data was expected in January 2017.

Another type of approach is tissue engineering, using biomaterials to help scaffold and rebuild damaged tissues. Biomaterials being investigated include natural substances such as collagen or agarose and synthetic ones like polymers and nitrocellulose. They fall into two categories: hydrogels and nanofibers. These materials can also be used as a vehicle for delivering gene therapy to tissues.

One avenue being explored to allow paralyzed people to walk and to aid in rehabilitation of those with some walking ability is the use of wearable powered robotic exoskeletons. The devices, which have motorized joints, are put on over the legs and supply a source of power to move and walk. Several such devices are already available for sale, but investigation is still underway as to how they can be made more useful.

Preliminary studies of epidural spinal cord stimulators for motor complete injuries have demonstrated some improvement, and in some cases to enable walking to some degree bypassing the injury.

In 2014, Darek Fidyka underwent pioneering spinal surgery that used nerve grafts, from his ankle, to bridge the gap in his severed spinal cord and olfactory ensheathing cells (OECs) to stimulate the spinal cord cells. The surgery was performed in Poland in collaboration with Prof. Geoff Raisman, chair of neural regeneration at University College London's Institute of Neurology, and his research team. The OECs were taken from the patient's olfactory bulbs in his brain and then grown in the lab, these cells were then injected above and below the impaired spinal tissue.

There have been a number of advances in technological spinal cord injury treatment, including the use of implants that provided a "digital bridge" between the brain and the spinal cord. In a study published in May 2023 in the journal Nature, researchers in Switzerland described such implants which allowed a 40-year-old man, paralyzed from the hips down for 12 years, to stand, walk and ascend a steep ramp with only the assistance of a walker. More than a year after the implant was inserted, he has retained these abilities and was walking with crutches even when the implant was switched off.

In March 2025, researchers reported that a paralyzed man stood for the first time after being injected of neural stem cells to treat his spinal cord injury. The first-of-its-kind study, which is not yet peer-reviewed, is encouraging scientists to consider if reprogrammed stem cells can be used in the future to treat people who are fully paralyzed. Reprogrammed cells are adult cells that are reverted to an embryonic-like state, from which they can be coaxed to develop into other cell types.

== See also ==
- Sexuality after spinal cord injury
- Paralyzed Veterans of America

== Bibliography ==
- Adams JG (5 September 2012). Emergency Medicine: Clinical Essentials. Elsevier Health Sciences. ISBN 978-1-4557-3394-1.
- Augustine JJ (21 November 2011). "Spinal trauma". In Campbell JR (ed.). International Trauma Life Support for Emergency Care Providers. Pearson Education. ISBN 978-0-13-300408-3.
- Bashir F, Malik AU, Abaidullah S (21 November 2017). "Epidemiology of Spinal Injuries, Geographical – Variations – Preventable Measures". Annals KEMU. 6 (1).
- Bigelow S, Medzon R (16 June 2011). "Injuries of the spine: Nerve". In Legome E, Shockley LW (eds.). Trauma: A Comprehensive Emergency Medicine Approach. Cambridge University Press. ISBN 978-1-139-50072-2.
- Brown J, Wyatt JP, Illingworth RN, Clancy MJ, Munro P (6 June 2008). Oxford American Handbook of Emergency Medicine. Oxford University Press. ISBN 978-0-19-977948-2.
- Cameron P, Jelinek G, Kelly AM, Brown AF, Little M (1 April 2014). Textbook of Adult Emergency Medicine: Expert Consult. Elsevier Health Sciences UK. ISBN 978-0-7020-5438-9.
- Cifu DK, Lew HL (10 September 2013). Handbook of Polytrauma Care and Rehabilitation. Demos Medical Publishing. ISBN 978-1-61705-100-5.
- Cortois F, Charvier K (21 May 2015). "Sexual dysfunction in patients with spinal cord lesions". In Vodusek DB, Boller F (eds.). Neurology of Sexual and Bladder Disorders: Handbook of Clinical Neurology. Elsevier Science. ISBN 978-0-444-63254-8.
- DeKoning EP (10 January 2014). "Cervical spine injuries". In Sherman, S., Weber, J., Schindlbeck, M., Patwari, R. (eds.). Clinical Emergency Medicine. McGraw-Hill Education. ISBN 978-0-07-179461-9.
- Elliott S (19 March 2010). "Sexual dysfunction in women with spinal cord injury". In Bono CM, Cardenas DD, Frost FS (eds.). Spinal Cord Medicine, Second Edition: Principles & Practice. Demos Medical Publishing. pp. 429–38. ISBN 978-1-935281-77-1.
- Field-Fote E (26 March 2009). "Spinal cord injury: An overview". In Field-Fote E (ed.). Spinal Cord Injury Rehabilitation. F.A. Davis. ISBN 978-0-8036-2319-4.
- Fallah A, Dance D, Burns AS (29 October 2012). "Rehabilitation of the individual with spinal cord injury". In Fehlings, M.G., Vaccaro, A.R., Maxwell B. (eds.). Essentials of Spinal Cord Injury: Basic Research to Clinical Practice. Thieme. ISBN 978-1-60406-727-9.
- Frontera WR, Silver JK, Rizzo TD (5 September 2014). Essentials of Physical Medicine and Rehabilitation. Elsevier Health Sciences. ISBN 978-0-323-22272-3.
- Fulk GD, Behrman AL, Schmitz TJ (23 July 2013). "Traumatic Spinal Cord Injury". In O'Sullivan S, Schmitz T (eds.). Physical Rehabilitation. F.A. Davis. ISBN 978-0-8036-4058-0.
- Hammell KW (11 December 2013). Spinal Cord Injury Rehabilitation. Springer. ISBN 978-1-4899-4451-1.
- Harvey L (2008). Management of Spinal Cord Injuries: A Guide for Physiotherapists. Elsevier Health Sciences. ISBN 978-0-443-06858-4.
- Holtz A, Levi R (6 July 2010). Spinal Cord Injury. Oxford University Press. ISBN 978-0-19-970681-5.
- Ilyas A, Rehman S (31 March 2013). Contemporary Surgical Management of Fractures and Complications. JP Medical Ltd. ISBN 978-93-5025-964-1.
- Marx J, Walls R, Hockberger R (1 August 2013). Rosen's Emergency Medicine: Concepts and Clinical Practice. Elsevier Health Sciences. ISBN 978-1-4557-4987-4.
- Miller E, Marini I (24 February 2012). "Sexuality and spinal cord injury counseling implications". In Marini I, Stebnicki MA (eds.). The Psychological and Social Impact of Illness and Disability, 6th Edition. Springer Publishing Company. ISBN 978-0-8261-0655-1.
- Moore K (2006). Clinically Oriented Anatomy. Lippincott Williams & Wilkins. ISBN 978-0-7817-3639-8.
- Morganti-Kossmann C, Raghupathi R, Maas A (19 July 2012). Traumatic Brain and Spinal Cord Injury: Challenges and Developments. Cambridge University Press. ISBN 978-1-107-00743-7.
- Namdari S, Pill S, Mehta S (21 October 2014). Orthopedic Secrets. Elsevier Health Sciences. ISBN 978-0-323-17285-1.
- Newman MF, Fleisher LA, Fink MP (2008). Perioperative Medicine: Managing for Outcome. Elsevier Health Sciences. ISBN 978-1-4160-2456-9.
- Peitzman AB, Fabian TC, Rhodes M, Schwab CW, Yealy DM (2012). The Trauma Manual: Trauma and Acute Care Surgery. Lippincott Williams & Wilkins. ISBN 978-1-4511-1679-3.
- Pellock JM, Myer EC (22 October 2013). Neurologic Emergencies in Infancy and Childhood. Elsevier Science. ISBN 978-1-4831-9392-2.
- Roos KL (7 March 2012). Emergency Neurology. Springer Science & Business Media. ISBN 978-0-387-88585-8.
- Sabharwal S (10 December 2013). Essentials of Spinal Cord Medicine. Demos Medical Publishing. ISBN 978-1-61705-075-6.
- Sabharwal S (5 September 2014). "Spinal cord injury (Cervical)". In Frontera WR, Silver JK, Rizzo TD (eds.). Essentials of Physical Medicine and Rehabilitation. Elsevier Health Sciences. ISBN 978-0-323-22272-3.
- Shah KH, Egan D, Quaas J (17 February 2012). Essential Emergency Trauma. Lippincott Williams & Wilkins. ISBN 978-1-4511-5318-7.
- Snell, R.S. (2010). "The spinal cord and the ascending and descending tracts". Clinical Neuroanatomy. Lippincott Williams & Wilkins. ISBN 978-0-7817-9427-5.
- Teufack S, Harrop JS, Ashwini DS (29 October 2012). "Spinal Cord Injury Classification". In Fehlings MG, Vaccaro AR, Maxwell B (eds.). Essentials of Spinal Cord Injury: Basic Research to Clinical Practice. Thieme. ISBN 978-1-60406-727-9.
- Weiss JM (15 March 2010). "Spinal cord injury". In Weiss, L.D., Weiss, J.M., Pobre, T. (eds.). Oxford American Handbook of Physical Medicine and Rehabilitation. Oxford University Press, USA. ISBN 978-0-19-970999-1.
- Wyatt JP, Illingworth RN, Graham CA, Hogg K, Robertson C, Clancy M (9 February 2012). Oxford Handbook of Emergency Medicine. OUP Oxford. ISBN 978-0-19-101605-9.
