= Albert Wojciech Adamkiewicz =

Polish pathologist

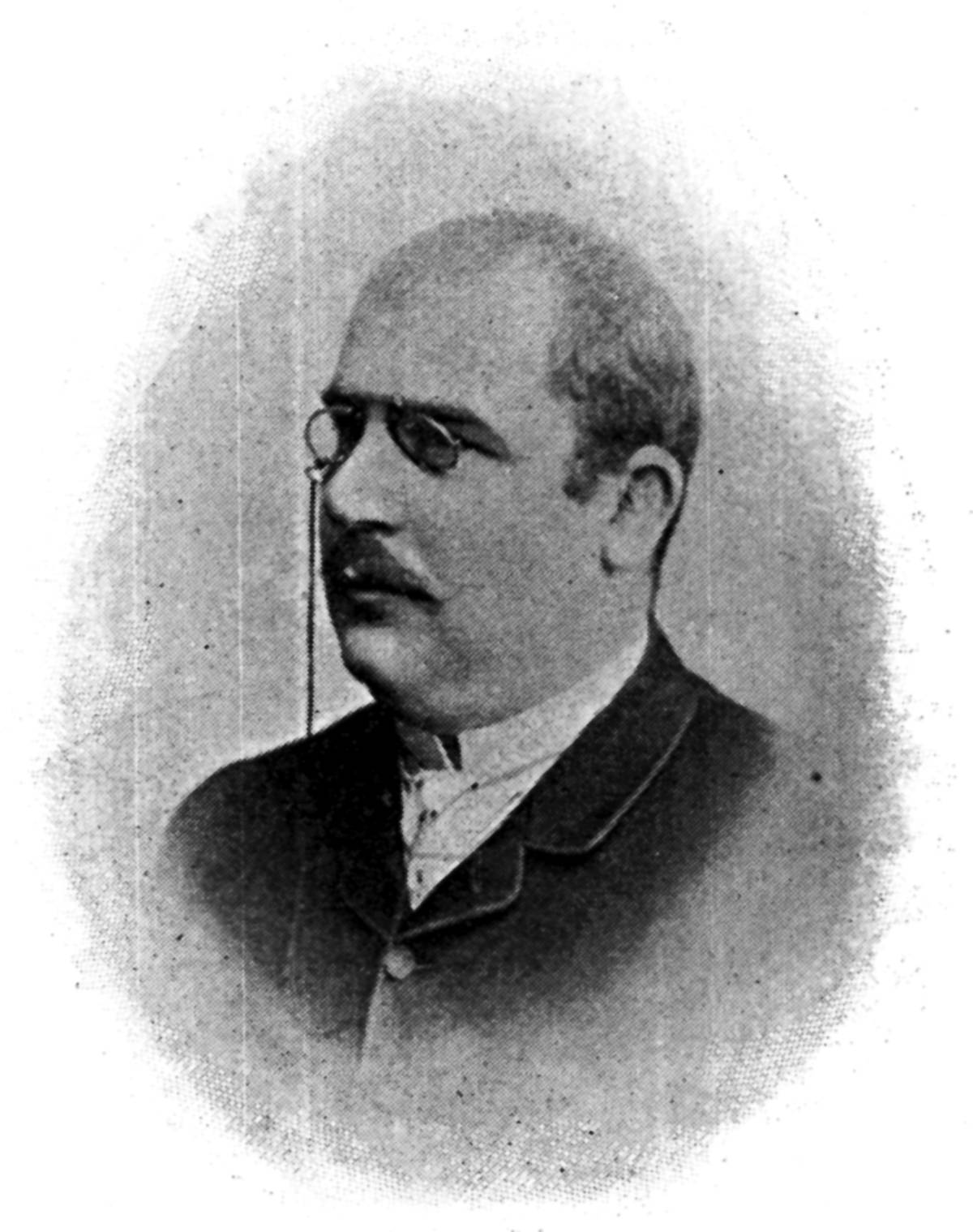
- Albert Wojciech Adamkiewicz (1850–1921)
- Born: 11 August 1850; Żerków
- Died: 31 October 1921 (aged 71)
- Education: University of Breslau; Jagiellonian University
- Known for: Artery of Adamkiewicz; Adamkiewicz reaction central nervous system
- Scientific career
- Fields: pathology

Albert Wojciech Adamkiewicz (Polish: [adamˈkʲɛvit͡ʂ]; 11 August 1850 – 31 October 1921) was a Polish pathologist.

== Biography ==
Adamkiewicz was born in Żerków. He earned his medical doctorate in 1873 from the University of Breslau where he was a student-assistant to physiologist Rudolf Peter Heinrich Heidenhain. From 1879 until 1892, he was chief of general and experimental pathology at the Jagiellonian University in Kraków.

Adamkiewicz is remembered for his pathological examinations of the central nervous system. His research of the variable vascularity of the spinal cord was an important contribution to the development of modern clinical vascular surgery. He is credited with describing the major anterior segmental medullary artery, which is also known as the Artery of Adamkiewicz.

In the early 1890s, Adamkiewicz published a series of articles claiming the discovery of a cancer-causing parasite he called Coccidium sarcolytus, as well as the existence of an anti-cancer serum. Further testing proved the serum a failure, and Adamkiewicz was severely criticized by the medical community at Jagiellonian University. Soon afterwards, he relocated to Vienna, where he practiced medicine at Rothschild Hospital.

He is credited for the creation of the Adamkiewicz test, a test for detecting tryptophan, an α-amino acid that is used in the biosynthesis of proteins.

== See also ==
- List of pathologists
