= Posterior spinal veins =

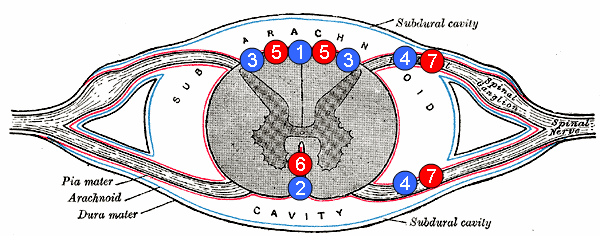
- 1: Posterior spinal vein 2: Anterior spinal vein 3: Posterolateral spinal vein 4: Radicular (or segmental medullary) vein 5: Posterior spinal arteries 6: Anterior spinal artery 7: Radicular (or segmental medullary) artery

Details
- Artery: Posterior spinal artery

Identifiers
- Latin: venae spinales posteriores
- TA98: A12.3.07.025
- TA2: 4946
- FMA: 70893

Posterior spinal veins are small veins which receive blood from the dorsal spinal cord.
