= Adamkiewicz reaction =

Biochemical reaction

The Adamkiewicz reaction is part of a biochemical test used to detect the presence of the amino acid tryptophan in proteins. When concentrated sulfuric acid is combined with a solution of protein and glyoxylic acid, a red/purple colour is produced. It was named after its discoverer, Albert Wojciech Adamkiewicz. Pure sulfuric acid and a minimal amount of pure formaldehyde, along with an oxidizing agent introduced into the sulfuric acid, allow the reaction to proceed. Later studies clarified the reaction's dependence on glyoxylic acid and its specific interaction with the amino acid tryptophan. These findings also shed light on the underlying chemical mechanism.

== Dependence on glyoxylic acid ==
In 1901, researchers Fredrick Hopkins and Sydney W. Cole determined that glyoxylic acid, an impurity in acetic acid, was an essential component in the Adamkiewicz reaction. It was observed that the violet-red characteristic of the reaction occurred only when glyoxylic acid was present in the acetic acid used in the reaction. Without glyoxylic acid, the reaction failed, even if other conditions remained unchanged. Their work demonstrated that glyoxylic acid, in the presence of concentrated sulfuric acid and tryptophan, reacted with proteins to produce the characteristic violet-red coloration of the Adamkiewicz reaction.

== Mechanism and the indole ring ==
The reaction relies on the interaction between glyoxylic acid and the indole ring of the amino acid tryptophan, a structural feature found in most proteins. When proteins are exposed to concentrated sulfuric acid and glyoxylic acid, the indole group undergoes a reaction that produces a highly colored compound. This interaction highlights tryptophan's central role in the test, as proteins lacking this amino acid do not produce the characteristic color change. Hopkins and Cole further noted that the sulfuric acid provided the acidic environment and acted as an oxidizing agent necessary for the reaction to proceed.

Later studies proposed that the reaction involves a condensation process, where glyoxylic acid combines with the indole group of tryptophan to form a complex quinonoid structure. This process explains the strong color change observed in the test and has been key to understanding tryptophan's chemical properties and its function in proteins.

== See also ==
- Tryptophan
- Glyoxylic acid
- Indole
