= Anterior spinal artery syndrome =

Human spinal cord disorder

Anterior spinal artery syndrome.
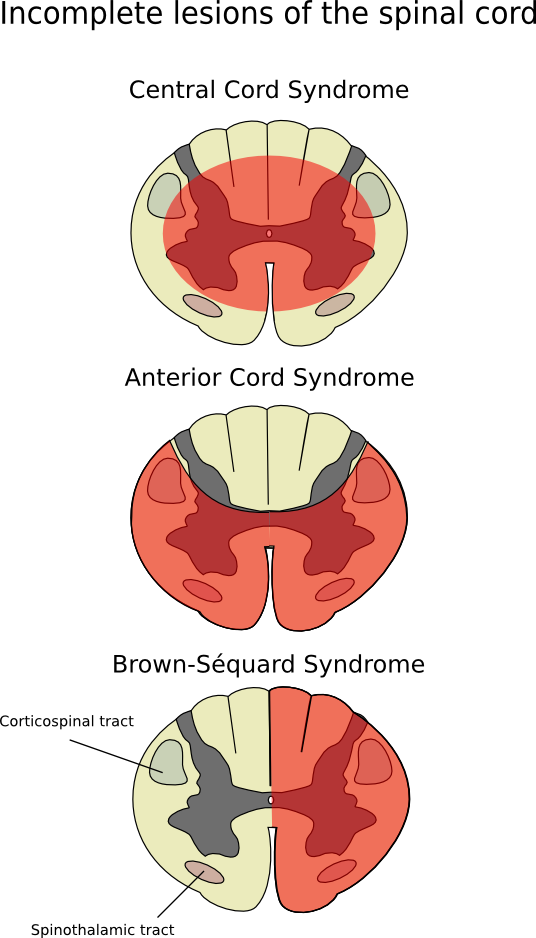
- Anterior cord syndrome is central diagram
- Specialty: Neurosurgery

Anterior spinal artery syndrome (also known as "anterior spinal cord syndrome") is caused by ischemia of the area supplied by the anterior spinal artery, resulting in loss of function of the anterior two-thirds of the spinal cord. The region affected includes the descending corticospinal tract, ascending spinothalamic tract, and autonomic fibers. It is characterized by a corresponding loss of motor function, loss of pain and temperature sensation, and hypotension.

Anterior spinal artery syndrome is the most common form of spinal cord infarction. The anterior spinal cord is at increased risk for infarction because it is supplied by the single anterior spinal artery and has little collateral circulation, unlike the posterior spinal cord which is supplied by two posterior spinal arteries.

== Signs and symptoms ==
- Complete motor paralysis below the level of the lesion due to interruption of the corticospinal tract
- Loss of pain and temperature sensation at and below the level of the lesion due to interruption of the spinothalamic tract
- Retained proprioception and vibratory sensation due to intact dorsal columns
- Autonomic dysfunction may be present and can manifest as hypotension (either orthostatic or frank hypotension), sexual dysfunction, and/or bowel and bladder dysfunction
- Areflexia, flaccid internal and external anal sphincter, urinary retention and intestinal obstruction may also be present in individuals with anterior cord syndrome.

Symptoms usually occur very quickly and are often experienced within one hour of the initial damage. Acute symptoms, presenting within hours of onset, include back pain, bilateral loss of temperature and pain sensation, flaccid paresis, and autonomic dysfunction. Autonomic dysfunction includes bladder dysfunction, neurogenic bowel, erectile dysfunction, and orthostatic hypotension. Vibration and proprioception are typically spared as the dorsal column is spared.

Late symptoms can occur within days to weeks from onset and include upper motor dysfunction (spastic paresis, hyperreflexia) as well as continued lower motor (flaccid paresis), sensory and autonomic dysfunction.

== Causes ==
Anterior spinal artery syndrome arises from compromise to the ventral portion of the spinal cord. The insult could be from direct damage such as mechanic injury or mass effect from a space occupying lesion. However, indirect causes are the most common cause of this syndrome, often secondary to ischemia of the anterior spinal artery from occlusion or hypoperfusion. Due to the branches of the aorta that supply the anterior spinal artery, the most common causes of this hypoperfusion are insufficiencies within the aorta. These include aortic aneurysms, dissections, direct trauma to the aorta, surgeries, and atherosclerosis. Acute disc herniation, cervical spondylosis, kyphoscoliosis, damage to the spinal column and neoplasia all could result in ischemia from anterior spinal artery occlusion leading to anterior spinal cord syndrome. Other causes include vasculitis, polycythemia, sickle cell disease, decompression sickness, and collagen and elastin disorders. A thrombus in the artery of Adamkiewicz can lead to an anterior spinal syndrome. This is the most feared, though rare complication of bronchial artery embolization done in massive hemoptysis. Risk factors for vascular compromise of the anterior spinal artery, like for cerebral stroke, include diabetes, hypertension and hyperlipidemia.

== Anatomy ==
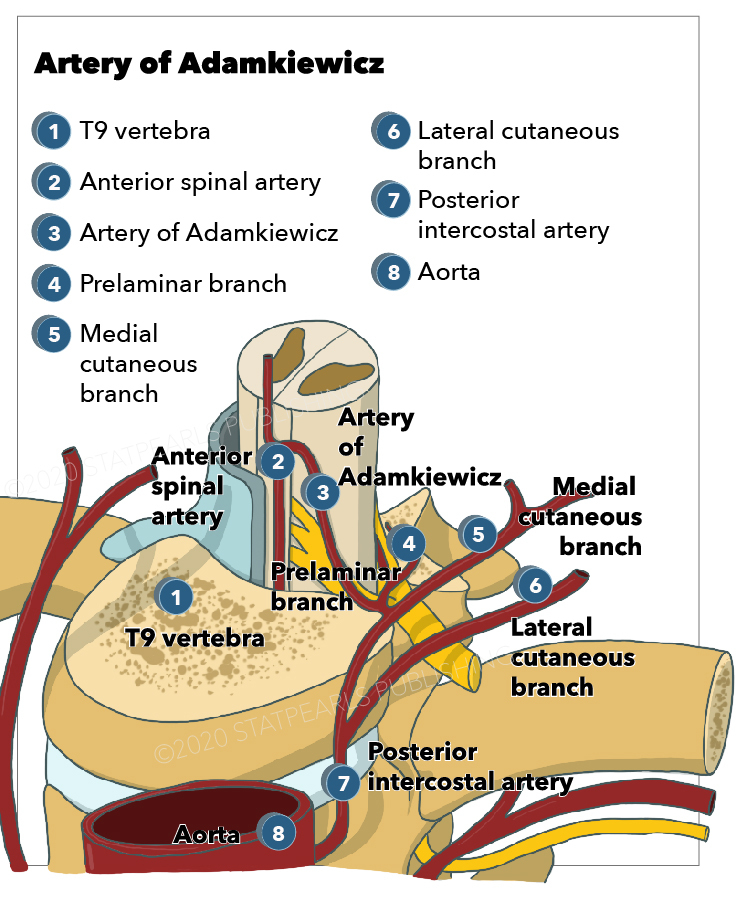

The anterior portion of the spinal cord is supplied by the anterior spinal artery. It begins at the foramen magnum where branches of the two vertebral arteries exit, merge, and descend along the anterior spinal cord. As the anterior spinal artery proceeds inferiorly, it receives branches originating mostly from the aorta. The largest aortic branch is the artery of Adamkiewicz which supplies the anterior spinal cord from the level of T8 vertebrae all the way to conus medullaris

== Diagnosis ==
MRI imaging of the spine is the first-line modality of choice to diagnose anterior spinal artery syndrome. Spinal MRI can rule out soft tissue masses and arteriovenous malformations that could cause hypoperfusion of the spinal cord. MRI DWI and T2 sequence are used to detect spinal cord ischemia, showing parenchymal changes in the anterior portion of the cord secondary to ischemia. Diffusion-weighted MRI may show changes within a few hours of symptom onset, whereas T2-weighted abnormalities often appear later. Specific characteristic MRI findings of spinal cord ischemia include a thin pencil-like hyperintense region in the anterior cord that involve multiple spinal levels on T2-weighted image, and central T2-hyperintense signal on either side of the median fissure resembling an owl’s eye appearance. On T1-weighted image, hypointensity can be appreciated over the area of compromise representing early inflammation/edema, however diffusion weighted image can distinguish ischemia from nonspecific inflammation. When vascular pathology is suspected, adjunct vascular imaging like MR or CT angiography can be used to evaluate the spinal vasculature and screen for aortic or vertebral artery dissection.

Other testing may include basic laboratory tests to evaluate vascular risk factors and alternative diagnoses (e.g., complete blood count, metabolic panel, lipids, inflammatory markers), with targeted serologies (infectious and autoimmune) as indicated. Cerebrospinal fluid analysis can help exclude traumatic etiology. Toxicology testing may be appropriate when vasospasm-inducing substances like cocaine are a concern.

== Treatment ==
Treatment is determined based on the primary cause of anterior spinal cord syndrome. When the diagnosis of anterior spinal cord syndrome is determined, the prognosis is unfortunate. The mortality rate is approximately 20%, with 50% of individuals living with anterior spinal cord syndrome having very little or no changes in symptoms.

== Epidemiology ==
The incidence of anterior spinal artery syndrome is estimated to be 0.23% at time of death. It represents 5% of all incomplete spinal cord syndromes. It is the most common type of spinal cord infarction, representing 87.2% of all spinal infarctions. Though specific demographic factor data is limited, female sex and older age are associated with poorer prognosis.

== Eponym ==
It is also known as "Beck's syndrome".

== See also ==
- Spinal cord injury
