= Segmental medullary artery =

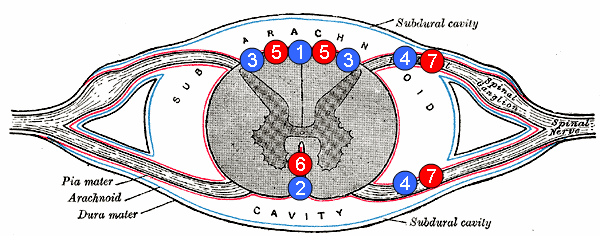
- 1: Posterior spinal vein 2: Anterior spinal vein 3: Posterolateral spinal vein 4: Radicular (or segmental medullary) vein 5: Posterior spinal arteries 6: Anterior spinal artery 7: Radicular artery

Details
- Branches: Anterior spinal artery

Identifiers
- Latin: arteria medullaris segmentalis
- TA98: A12.2.11.016; A12.2.08.007; A12.2.12.007
- TA2: 4535
- FMA: 86039

Segmental medullary arteries are arteries of varying size in the thoracolumbar region that arise from segmental arteries of this region (posterior intercostal arteries or lumbar arteries) and pass through intervertebral foramina to supply the spinal cord. They may join the anterior spinal artery.

The largest anterior segmental medullary artery is known as the artery of Adamkiewicz.

== Anatomy ==
=== Development ===
During embryological development, about 75% of the segmental medullary arteries regress, forming the thinner (anterior and posterior) radicular arteries (which supply the two roots and sensory ganglion of each spinal nerve); the remaining segmental medullary arteries persist to contribute arterial supply to the spinal cord, as well as giving rise to the aforementioned radicular arteries.

== Gallery ==
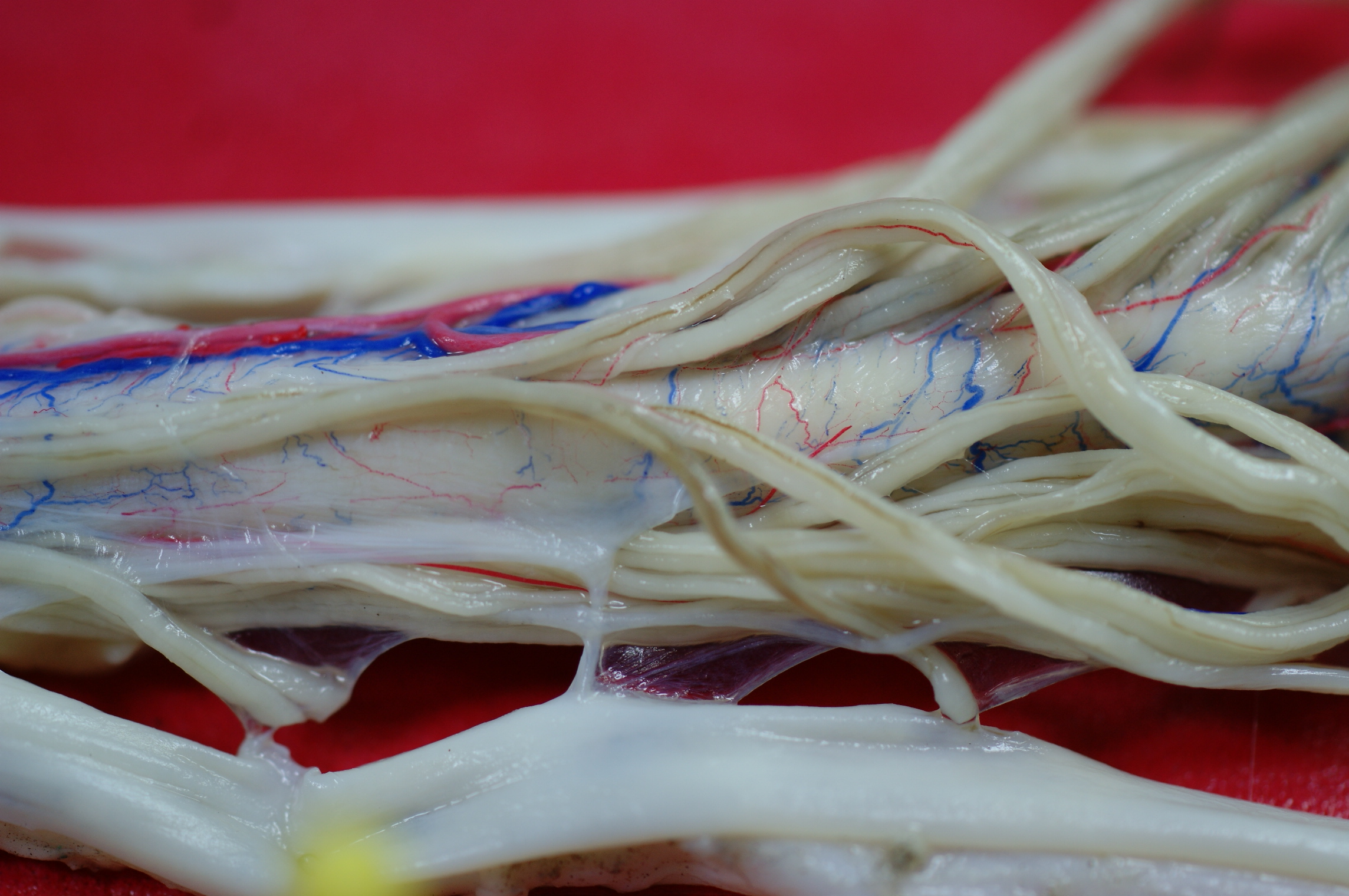
Great Posterior Radiculomedullary Artery as seen in the posterior surface of the spinal cord
