= Anterior spinal artery =

Blood vessel in the front of the spinal cord

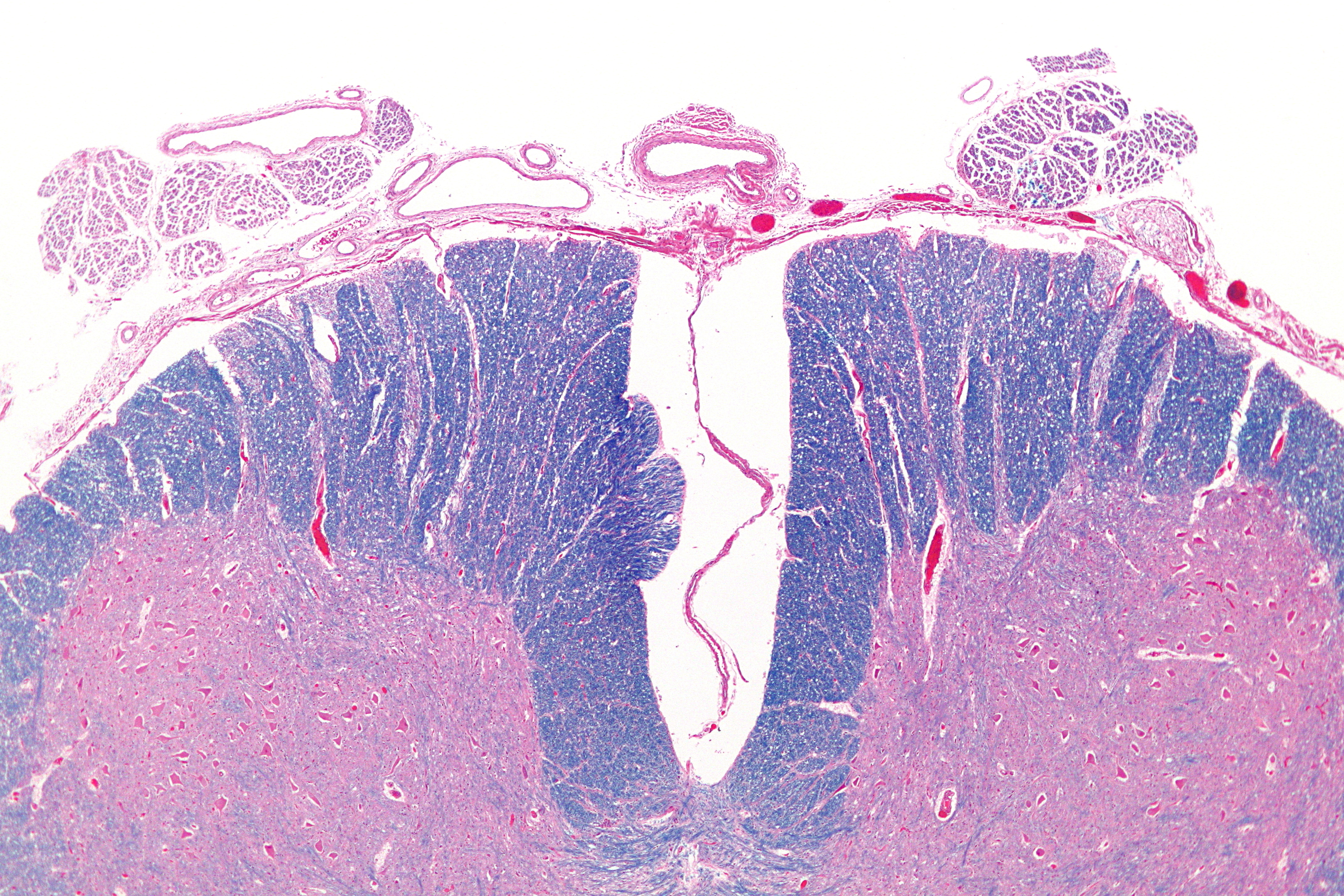
- Micrograph showing an axial section of the anterior spinal cord and anterior spinal artery (top-middle of image). LFB-HE stain.

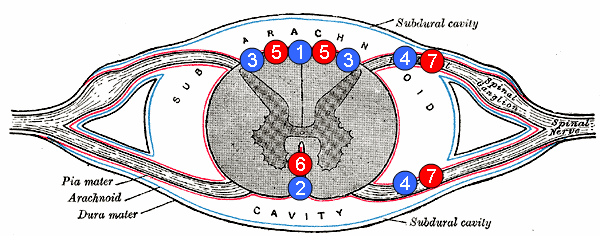
- 1: Posterior spinal vein 2: Anterior spinal vein 3: Posterolateral spinal vein 4: Radicular (or segmental medullary) vein 5: Posterior spinal arteries 6: Anterior spinal artery 7: Radicular (or segmental medullary) artery

Details
- Source: Vertebral arteries
- Vein: Anterior spinal veins

Identifiers
- Latin: arteria spinalis anterior
- TA98: A12.2.08.016
- TA2: 4525
- FMA: 50531

In human anatomy, the anterior spinal artery is the artery that supplies the anterior portion of the spinal cord. It arises from branches of the vertebral arteries and courses along the anterior aspect of the spinal cord. It is reinforced by several contributory arteries, especially the artery of Adamkiewicz.

== Anatomy ==
=== Origin ===
The anterior spinal artery typically arises bilaterally as two small branches near the termination of the vertebral arteries.

=== Course ===
Descending in front of the medulla oblongata, they unite at the level of the foramen magnum. The single trunk descends in the front of the medulla spinalis, extending to the lowest part of the medulla spinalis. It is continued as a slender twig on the filum terminale. The vessel passes in the pia mater along the anterior median fissure.

=== Branches ===
On its course the artery takes several small branches (i.e. anterior segmental medullary arteries), which enter the vertebral canal through the intervertebral foramina. These branches are derived from the vertebral artery, the ascending cervical artery, a branch of the inferior thyroid artery in the neck, the intercostal arteries in the thorax, and from the lumbar artery, iliolumbar artery and lateral sacral arteries in the abdomen and pelvis.

=== Distribution ===
It supplies the pia mater, and the substance of the medulla spinalis, also sending off branches at its lower part to be distributed to the cauda equina.

== Disorders ==
Disruption of the anterior spinal artery leads to bilateral disruption of the corticospinal tract, causing motor deficits, and bilateral disruption of the spinothalamic tract, causing sensory deficits in the form of pain/temperature sense loss. It is called anterior spinal artery syndrome. This occurs when the disruption of the anterior spinal artery is at the level of the spinal cord. Contrast this with medial medullary syndrome, when the anterior spinal artery is occluded at the level of the medulla oblongata.

Disruption of its perforating branches (sulcal artery) can result in a hemicord syndrome. In fact, acute sulcal artery syndrome should be suspected in patients with acute hemicord syndrome, and vertebral artery dissection should be suspected in cases of high cervical cord involvement. In a recent review by Tan YJ, et al. in 2021, good functional recovery was seen in most, and vertebral artery dissection was the leading cause of sulcal artery syndrome.

== Additional images ==
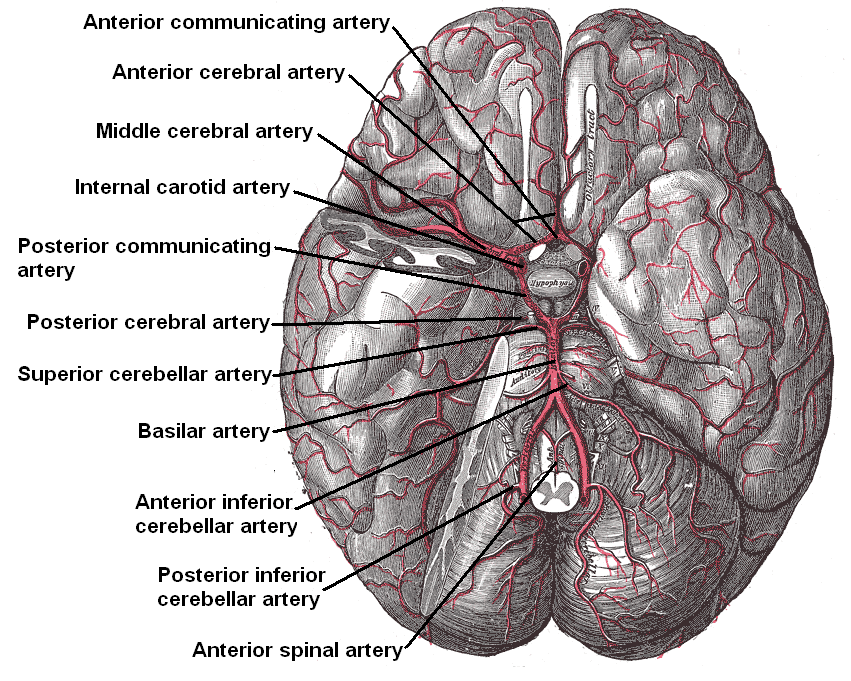
The arteries of the base of the brain.

Arteries of the brain, brain stem and upper spinal cord (inferior view).
