= Artery of Adamkiewicz =

Largest anterior segmental medullary artery

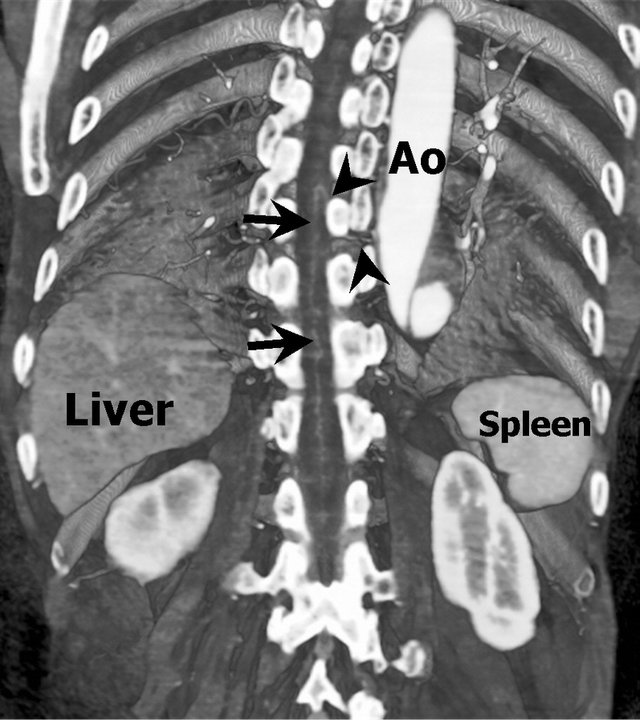
- Coronal slab volume rendering image of CT aortography shows artery of Adamkiewicz entering spinal canal(arrowheads) and joining the anterior spinal artery (arrows) after a hairpin turn.

Details
- Source: Abdominal aorta, posterior intercostal artery
- Branches: Anterior spinal artery
- Supplies: Lumbar enlargement of lower spinal cord

Identifiers
- Latin: rami spinales arteriae vertebralis
- TA2: 4536

In human anatomy, the artery of Adamkiewicz (also arteria radicularis magna) is the largest anterior segmental medullary artery and the dominant segmental feeding vessel to the thoracic cord, supplying the anterior aspect of the cord (from T8 to the conus medullaris) via the anterior spinal artery. It is a radiculomedullary artery arising from the spinal dorsal branch of the segmental artery (posterior intercostal, subcostal, or lumbar artery), which in turn arises from the descending aorta. It typically arises from the 9th left posterior intercostal artery, enters through the L2-L3 intervertebral foramen to join the anterior spinal artery and supply much of the inferior half of the spinal cord. The artery is named after pathologist Albert Wojciech Adamkiewicz.

== Nomenclature ==
The artery is generally eponymic, but it has several other names, including:

- great radicular artery of Adamkiewicz
- major anterior segmental medullary artery
- artery of the lumbar enlargement
- great anterior radiculomedullary artery
- great anterior segmental medullary artery
- great ventral radicular artery

== Anatomy ==
The artery has a characteristic "hairpin" turn on the cord surface as it first courses superiorly, then turns inferiorly. In 75% of people, it originates on the left side of the aorta between the T8 and L1 vertebral segments. In addition to being able to be either right or left-sided, the vessel can arise from a lumbar artery instead of from the aorta.

In an extensive literature review, recognition of the AKA using CT and/or MR was achieved in 466 of 555 cases (83.96%) and in 384 (83.3%) cases the AKA originated from a left intercostal artery.

== Clinical significance ==
The artery provides blood supply to the front two-thirds of the lumbar and sacral cord. When damaged or obstructed, it can result in a syndrome of spinal cord ischemia, similar to anterior spinal artery syndrome, with loss of urinary and fecal continence and impaired motor function of the legs; sensory function is often preserved to a degree.

It is important to identify the location of the artery when surgically treating an aortic aneurysm to prevent damage which would result in a loss of blood supply to the spinal cord.

In bronchial artery embolization for treatment of massive lung bleeding, one of the most serious complications is to lose blood flow to the spinal cord caused by accidental closure of the artery of Adamkiewicz. Its location can be identified with computed tomographic angiography.

== History ==
It is named for Albert Wojciech Adamkiewicz.
