= Posterior spinal artery =

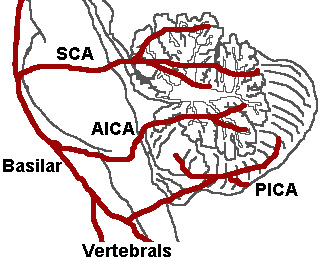
- The three major arteries of the cerebellum: the SCA, AICA, and PICA. (Posterior spinal artery is not labeled, but region is visible.)

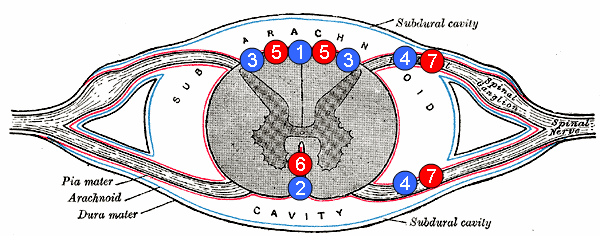
- 1: Posterior spinal vein 2: Anterior spinal vein 3: Posterolateral spinal vein 4: Radicular (or segmental medullary) vein 5: Posterior spinal arteries 6: Anterior spinal artery 7: Radicular (or segmental medullary) artery

Details
- Source: Vertebral or posterior inferior cerebellar
- Branches: Descending and ascending branch
- Vein: Posterior spinal veins

Identifiers
- Latin: arteria spinalis posterior
- TA2: 4527
- FMA: 50522

The posterior spinal artery (dorsal spinal arteries) arises from the vertebral artery in 25% of humans or the posterior inferior cerebellar artery in 75% of humans, adjacent to the medulla oblongata. It is usually double, and spans the length of the spinal cord. It supplies the grey and white posterior columns of the spinal cord.

== Structure ==
The posterior spinal artery arises above the foramen magnum. It passes posteriorly to descend the medulla passing through and behind of the posterior roots of the spinal nerves. Along its course it is reinforced by a succession of segmental or radiculopial branches, which enter the vertebral canal through the intervertebral foramina, forming a plexus called the vasocorona with the anterior vertebral arteries.

Below the medulla spinalis and upper cervical spine, the posterior spinal arteries are rather discontinuous; unlike the anterior spinal artery, which can be traced as a distinct channel throughout its course, the posterior spinal arteries are seen as somewhat larger longitudinal channels of an extensive pial arterial meshwork. At the level of the conus medullaris, the posterior spinals are more frequently seen as distinct arteries, communicating with the anterior spinal artery to form a characteristic "basket" which angiographically defines the caudal extent of the spinal cord and its transition to the cauda equina.

=== Branches ===
Close to its origin each posterior spinal artery gives off an ascending branch, which ends ipsilaterally near the fourth ventricle.

=== Anastomoses ===
Branches from the posterior spinal arteries form a free anastomosis around the posterior roots of the spinal nerves, and communicate, by means of very tortuous transverse branches, with the vessels of the opposite side. There are few anastomoses with the anterior spinal artery except at the inferior extremity of the spinal cord.

== Functions ==
Most cranially, the posterior spinal artery supplies the dorsal column of the closed medulla containing fasciculus gracilis, gracile nucleus, fasciculus cuneatus, and cuneate nucleus. At the spinal cord level, the posterior spinal artery supplies the dorsal and lateral column as well as the peripheral part of the anterior and central column.

== Clinical significance ==
Disruption of blood supply to this particular artery in the medulla would result in a number of sensory deficits. If occlusion occurs above the level of sensory decussation, it would affect the proprioception, vibration, and two-point discrimination of the contralateral side of the body. When occlusion occurs below the level of sensory decussation, however, it would cause the effect on the ipsilateral side instead. Particularly at the upper cervical spinal cord where the posterior spinal artery supplies some parts of the ventral column, lesion might extend to the anterolateral system and triggers the loss of pain and temperature sensation on the contralateral side of the body.
