= Leptomeningeal cancer =

Neoplastic meningitis
- Other names: Carcinomatous meningitis, leptomeningeal carcinoma, leptomeningeal carcinomatosis, leptomeningeal metastasis, meningeal carcinomatosis, meningeal metastasis, meningitis carcinomatosa, leptomeningeal disease (LMD), neoplastic meningitis
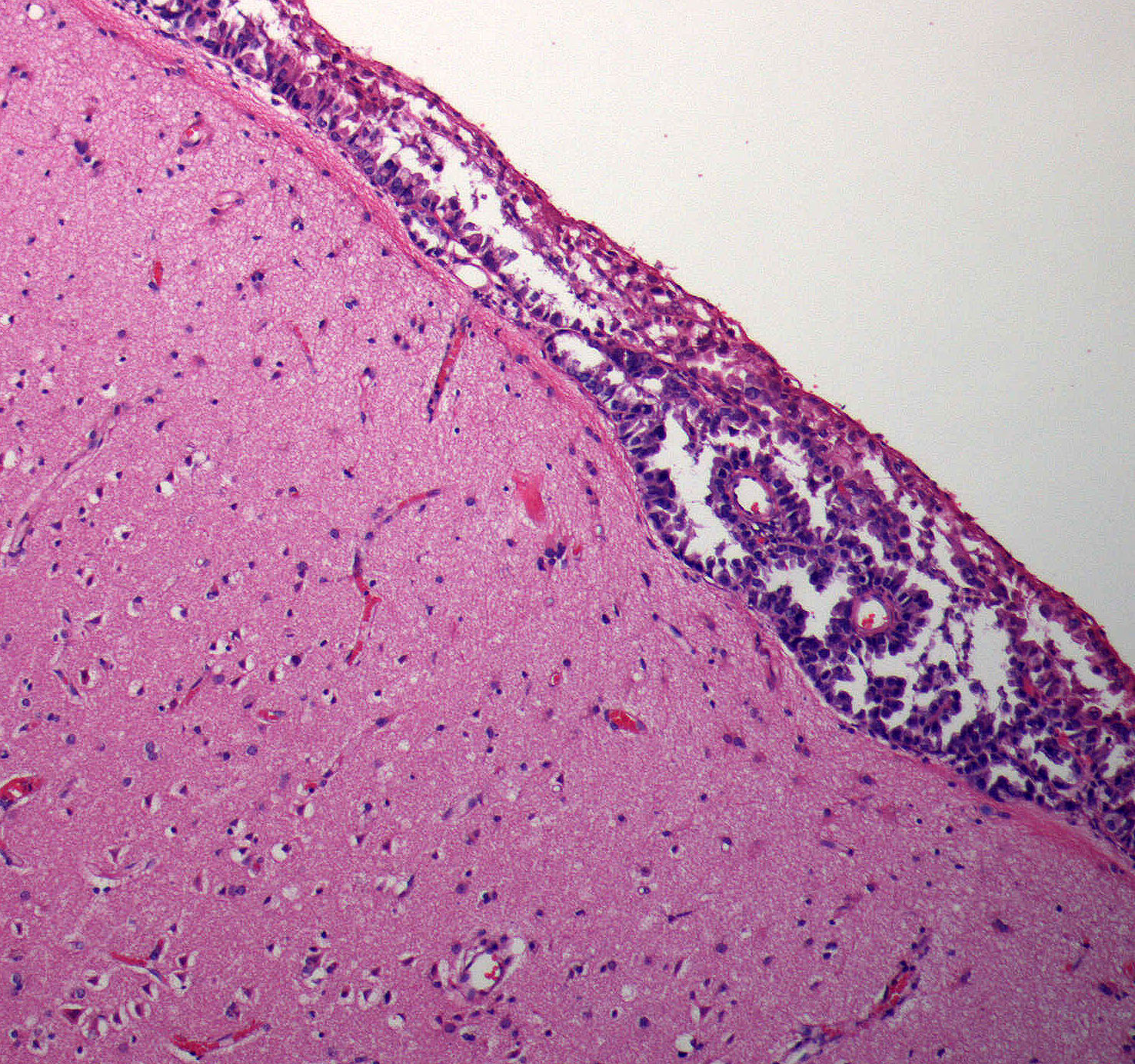
- Meningeal carcinomatosis: tumor cell clusters in the subarachnoid space in a brain biopsy
- Specialty: Oncology, neurology

Leptomeningeal cancer is a rare complication of cancer in which the disease spreads from the original tumor site to the meninges surrounding the brain and spinal cord. This leads to an inflammatory response, hence the alternative names neoplastic meningitis (NM), malignant meningitis, or carcinomatous meningitis. The term leptomeningeal (from the Greek lepto, meaning 'fine' or 'slight') describes the thin meninges, the arachnoid and the pia mater, between which the cerebrospinal fluid is located. The disorder was originally reported by Eberth in 1870. It is also known as leptomeningeal carcinomatosis, leptomeningeal disease (LMD), leptomeningeal metastasis, meningeal metastasis and meningeal carcinomatosis.

It occurs with cancers that are most likely to spread to the central nervous system. The most common cancers that spread to the leptomeninges are breast cancer, lung cancer, and melanomas because they can metastasize to the subarachnoid space in the brain which offers a hospitable environment for the growth of metastatic tumor cells. Individuals whose cancer has spread to an area of the brain known as the posterior fossa have a greater risk of developing a leptomeningeal cancer. The condition can also arise from primary brain tumor like medulloblastoma.

Leptomeningeal disease is becoming more evident because cancer patients are living longer and many chemotherapies cannot reach sufficient concentrations in the spinal fluid to kill the tumor cells.

== Signs and symptoms ==
Depending on where the tumor cells settle, leptomeningeal cancer can cause almost any neurological problem.

The most common symptoms of leptomeningeal cancer are pain and seizures. The other symptoms may include headaches (usually associated with nausea, vomiting, light-headedness), gait difficulties from weakness or ataxia, memory problems, incontinence, and sensory abnormalities. In some cases, symptoms may include double vision, vision loss, numb chin, back pain, leg weakness, sphincter-related problems, hydrocephalus, loss of urine control, and difficulty walking.

Other symptoms that are less common cranial nerve abnormalities, spinal symptoms such as limb weakness and paresthesia, and bowel and bladder dysfunction.

Diplopia is the most common symptom of cranial nerve dysfunction. Trigeminal sensory or motor loss, cochlear dysfunction, and optic neuropathy are also common findings.

Spinal signs and symptoms include weakness, dermatomal or segmental sensory loss, and pain in the neck, back, or following radicular patterns.

3 affected domains of neurological function:

- Cerebral hemisphere (15%)
- Cranial nerves (35%)
- Spinal cord and roots (60%)

Signs reported:

- Headache
- Mental status change
- Confusion
- Cognitive impairment
- Seizures
- Hemiparesis
- Gait instability

=== Related diseases ===
- Parenchymal disease occurs in 30% to 40% of those diagnosed with NM. The disease associated with the main functioning body of an organ, in this case the brain.
- Acute cerebellar ataxia is a rare initial presenting feature of NM, particularly in gastric cancer. Paraneoplastic cerebellar degeneration (PCD) is a well-known cause of cerebellar ataxia associated with neoplastic disorders, and commonly, with positivity for various anti-neuronal antibodies.
- Bilateral sensorineural hearing loss caused by complications with the vestibulocochlear nerves from onset of NM
- Subacute confusion: when functioning of the brain such as cognition deteriorates but at a less rapid rate than that of acute confusion

== Causes ==
Leptomeningeal carcinomatosis occurs when the cancer cells invade the cerebrospinal fluid and spread throughout the central nervous system. The metastatic tumor cells grow either attached to the pia mater covering the brain and spinal cord or floating unattached to the subarachnoid space. Tumors of diverse origins and hematologic cancers may spread to this space.

Some patients may develop leptomeningeal cancer while receiving chemotherapy for their primary tumour, partly because the blood-brain barrier serves as a protective filter that shields the central nervous system from toxins and pathogens circulating in the blood. While essential for protection, this barrier also complicates treatment, as many chemotherapy agents and biopharmaceuticals struggle to cross into the brain and spinal cord.

== Pathology ==
There are three anatomic patterns by which the tumor can spread in the subarachnoid space. More than one pattern may coexist in the same patient.

First, there may be plaque-like deposits of cells in the leptomeninges with invasion of Virchow-Robin spaces and, usually, the shedding of tumor cells into the cerebrospinal fluid.

Second, there may only be a thin coating of meninges, in some cases with only a single cell layer, but also with shedding of tumor cells into the cerebrospinal fluid. Third, there may be a pattern of nodular deposits of tumor on cranial and spinal nerve roots, frequently without tumor cells being shed into the cerebrospinal fluid.

The first and third patterns are common in solid tumors whereas the second occurs most frequently with leukemia and lymphoma.

=== Spinal cord ===
Neoplastic meningitis (NM) shows diffuse infiltration of tumor cells into the subarachnoid space which may be associated with increased intracranial pressure, signs of meningeal irritation, and damage to the cranial and spinal nerve roots. Pathological feature include:

- Circular necrosis of the white matter in the periphery of the spinal cord was also noted which probably resulted from circulatory disturbance secondary to tumor infiltration.
- Dorsal radiculopathy which is secondary ascending degeneration of the posterior funiculus may also occur due to malignant cells collecting or a presence of tumor which cause compression of the nerve.
- Tumor cell proliferation is observed around nerve roots as well as loss of myelinated nerve fibers and axonal swelling. In areas of tumor cells, infiltration of macrophages is observed. Nerve root infiltration has shown positive correlation with meningeal dissemination.
- Infiltration of the spinal cord parenchyma is found with destruction of the pia mater. Tumor cell infiltration is associated with spongy changes in the white matter of the spinal cord beneath the pia mater with demyelination, axonal swelling, and macrophage infiltration. Transverse necrosis of the spinal cord is usually marked with bleeding from tumor growth in the subarachnoid space and is the result of compression by the hematoma in the subarachnoid space.

=== From primary cancer to the meninges ===
NM is a secondary cancer meaning that it is the result of neoplastic cells that have metastasized from a primary cancer site. These cancers develop an enzyme that is able to break down blood vessels at a microscopic level. These cells enter the blood vessels and travel across the body. Once the brain is reached, they break down the blood–brain barrier to enter the Cerebrospinal Fluid (CSF). There the cancerous cells seed and disseminate into the leptomeninges which are composed of the arachnoid and the pia. The CSF continues to carry neoplastic cells through the brain tracts and spreads the cancerous cells.

Lung cancer, breast cancer, and melanoma comprise the majority of solid tumors spreading to the leptomeninges. Although rare, meningeal carcinomatosis can arise from cervical cancer. Only eight cases of MC arising from squamous cell carcinoma of the uterine cervix are previously reported in the literature.

Since NM is a result of primary cancer metastasis and can develop from primary brain tumors or parenchymal metastasis when tumor cells are lodged in small central nervous system (CNS) vasculature, causing local ischemia and vessel damage which result in tumor spillage into the Virchow-Robin spaces and providing access to the subarachnoid space.

=== Invasion routes ===
- Hematogenous spread, or spread through blood vessels, occurs either through the venous plexus of Batson or by arterial dissemination. This occurs with arterioles as a result of tumor cells being lodged in vessels that feed the meninges and later causing leakage into the meninges and CSF. This same situation also appear with spinal arteries where leakage of tumor cells is into the nerve roots. More regarding the effects of NM on spinal cord is discussed later. Tumor cells may also seed the choroid plexus, where CSF is produced, and ultimately gaining direct access to the CSF. Seeding of the choroid plexus is most common in patients with third and lateral ventricular hydrocephalus.
- Venous spread may occur when intra-abdominal or thoracic pressure increases and venous flow is retrograde which then allows tumor cells in the systemic venous system to enter the vertebral venous system.
- Centripetal migration from systemic tumors along perineural, invasion of nerve space, or perivascular spaces. Malignant cells can migrate along spinal or cranial nerve epineurium-perineurium, invade the subpial space, and travel along blood vessels into the endoneurial space, or invade the nerve parenchyma.

Infiltration happens most often at the base of the brain, dorsal surface, and especially at the cauda equina, which is largely due to the effect of gravity. Once in the CSF, malignant cells can extend along the membrane surfaces or spread freely in the CSF and attach to other locations. These cells have the ability to penetrate the pial membrane and invade the spinal cord and cranial nerves.

=== Infiltration to spinal cord ===
Infiltration from the subarachnoid space into the spinal cord occurs primarily along the perivascular tissues that surround blood vessels at the brain entrance. Infiltration from the anterior median fissure, a 3mm deep furrow on the anterior side of the spinal cord, to the anterior horn of the spinal cord, the ventral grey matter of the spinal cord, is found along the central artery. Direct infiltration of the nerve roots is also observed, mostly from the dorsal roots (the afferent sensory root of the spinal nerve) than the ventral roots (the efferent motor root of a spinal nerve).

With mild infiltration, tumor cells are found diffusely in the subarachnoid space from the cervical to sacral levels. In some cases however there are no differences between spine levels. Infiltration from the subarachnoid space into the spinal cord occurs mainly along the perivascular space of the white matter. However, in some cases, direct infiltration into the spinal cord parenchyma is found together with destruction of the pia mater.

== Diagnosis ==
Screening involves an MRI scan to identify and diagnose tumors in the subarachnoid region of the brain. MRI can make a diagnosis even without an analysis of the cerebrospinal fluid but it can sometimes be difficult to detect because MRI scans cannot always pick up the problem.

Diagnosis is most commonly made by lumbar puncture to detect malignant cells in the CSF, although the tests may be negative in roughly 10% of patients. Diagnosis often requires a high index of suspicion and is confirmed by neuroimaging and cerebrospinal fluid analysis.

CSF examination is the most useful diagnostic tool for NM. Patients with suspected NM should undergo one or two lumbar punctures, cranial magnetic resonance imaging (MRI), spinal MRI, and a radioisotope CSF flow study to rule out sites of CSF block. If the cytology remains negative and radiological studies are not definitive, consideration may be given to ventricular or lateral cervical spine CSF analysis based on the suspected site of predominant disease. Consideration of signs, symptoms, and neuroimaging can help with the placement to where CSF is drawn. Median time of diagnosis from initial primary cancer diagnosis is between 76 days and 17 months.

=== Difficulties in diagnosis ===
Cerebrospinal fluid (CSF) analysis remains the gold standard for the diagnosis of leptomeningeal disease (LMD). CSF is most commonly obtained via lumbar puncture, with cytological examination used to identify malignant cells. In addition to cytology, abnormalities in CSF cell count and biochemical parameters- particularly elevated protein levels - are observed in approximately 90% of LMD cases and provide supportive diagnostic evidence. Despite this, definitive diagnosis remains challenging due to the limited sensitivity of initial CSF cytology and the heterogeneity of clinical presentation. Magnetic resonance imaging (MRI) is typically employed as the first-line diagnostic modality due to its non-invasive nature; however, its diagnostic performance is moderate, with reported sensitivity and specificity of approximately 75% and 77%, respectively.

=== Techniques ===
- MRI: Meningeal findings are described with the following characteristics: Nodular meningeal tumor, meningeal thickening >3 mm and a subjectively strong contrast enhancement. A smooth contrast enhancement of the meninges was judged to be typical for inflammatory, nonneoplastic meningitis.
- CSF cytology: is performed after drawing the CSF by lumbar puncture.
- Cytogenetic: measures chromosomal content of cells and fluorescence in situ hybridization which detects numerical and structural genetic aberrations as a sign of malignancy. This is especially useful for liquid tumors such as leukemia and lymphoma. Some of the techniques that achieve this are flow cytometry and DNA single-cell cytometry. However, cytogenetic only assist in diagnosis and is less preferred.
- Meningeal Biopsy: may be performed when all of the above criteria is inconclusive, or if the primary malignancy is unknown. Biopsy is only effective when performed at the region where there's enhancement on the MRI.

=== Cerebral spinal fluid ===
Criteria for CSF abnormalities include:

- Increased opening pressure (> 200mm of H_{2}O)
- Increased Leukocytes (>4/mm3)
- Elevated protein (>50 mg/dL)
- Decreased glucose (<60 mg/dL)

==== Tumor markers ====
These markers can help aid diagnosis of NM but most are not sensitive, or specific enough for routine diagnosis:

- Carcinoembryonic antigen (CEA)
- alpha-fetoprotein
- beta-human chorionic gonadotropin
- carbohydrate antigen19-9
- creatine-kinase BB
- isoenzyme
- tissue polypeptide antigen
- Beta-2 microglobulin
- beta-glucoronidase
- lactate dehydrogenase isoenzyme-5
- vascular endothelial growth factor

Recently cell-free DNA in cerebrospinal fluid has been evaluated as a means of detecting tumor-specific somatic mutations using next-generation sequencing, offering potential for improved tumor detection.

== Treatment ==
There is currently no cure for leptomeningeal disease as the tumor is hard to eradicate. Current treatments for leptomeningeal tumors are palliative. The goals for treatment include prolonging survival and stabilizing neurological symptoms.

=== Radiotherapy ===
Radiotherapy is used mostly for focal type of NM due to the nature of damage and success rate associated with the treatment. Radiotherapy targets the tumor and destroys the collective tissues of cancerous cells.

Proton therapy, which delivers radiation via charged protons rather than X-rays, has recently shown promise as an effective treatment for leptomeningeal disease.

=== Chemotherapy ===
Chemotherapy is injected directly into the cerebrospinal fluid, either by lumbar puncture ("spinal tap") or through a surgically implanted device called an Ommaya reservoir. Intrathecal Therapy is preferred since intravenous chemotherapy do not penetrate the BBB. The most common chemicals used are liposomal cytarabine (DepoCyte) and intrathecal methotrexate (MTX).

The downside of a spinal tap diagnosis is that while it is highly accurate and reliable, it can also report false-negative results. Chemotherapy is delivered intrathecally as it is hard for drugs to make it into the central nervous system. Intrathecal chemotherapy can only penetrate a few millimeters. If the tumor is any thicker, radiation is given to shrink it down.

The treatment is done to reduce pressure on the brain caused by any cerebrospinal fluid buildup and to reduce the number of cancer cells causing the pressure. For the best care, patients should see a physician who regularly treats leptomeningeal cancer and is most up-to-date on medicines that penetrate the blood-brain barrier, how to treat the symptoms, and clinical trials that might include patients with leptomeningeal cancer.

=== Risks of treatments ===
Both Chemotherapy and Radiotherapy are harmful to the body and most definitely the brain. Caution must be utilized in treating patients with NM. Another factor that makes treatment difficult is that there is no suitable method to evaluate the disease progression.

== Prognosis ==
The prognosis is generally poor with survival typically measured in months. The median survival time of patients without treatment is four to six weeks. The best prognoses are seen from NM due to breast cancer with the median overall survival of no more than six months after diagnosis of NM. Death is generally due to progressive neurological dysfunction. Treatment is meant to stabilize neurological function and prolong survival. Neurological dysfunction usually cannot be fixed but progressive dysfunction can be halted and survival may be increased to four to six months.

It occurs in approximately 3-5% of cancer patients. The disease is usually terminal and if left untreated, the median survival is 4–6 weeks whereas if treated, the median survival can increase to 2–3 months. Treatment will be more effective if it is done on the primary tumor before it metastasizes to the brain or spinal cord.

Patients with leukaemia achieve better results compared to patients with solid tumours who have undergone treatment. It was found that 75% of patients stabilize or improve over several months as opposed to 25% of patients who do not respond and have progressive disease. But despite initial improvement, most patients survive only a few months. Breast cancer and small cell lung cancer are the two solid tumors that respond best to treatment Some patients do better than others, particularly those whose primary cancer is hematologic, bone marrow and lymph nodes.

=== Factors that lower survival ===
Much of prognosis can be determined from the damage due to primary cancer. Negative hormone receptor status, poor performance status, more than 3 chemotherapy regimes, and high Cyfra 21-1 level at diagnosis, all indicates lower survival period of patients with NM. Cyfra 21-1 is a fragment of the cytokeratin 19 and may reflect the tumor burden within the CSF.

== Epidemiology ==
In the United States, 1–8% of cancer patients are diagnosed with leptomeningeal disease, with approximately 110,000 cases per year. The exact incidence of leptomeningeal disease is difficult to determine, since gross examination at autopsy may overlook signs of leptomeningeal disease, and microscopic pathological inspection may be normal if the seeding is multifocal or if an unaffected area of the central nervous system (CNS) is examined.

== Current research ==
New treatments and clinical trials for breast cancer patients, non-small cell lung cancer patients, and patients with high grade gliomas or other solid tumors with leptomeningeal disease are currently being explored.

People with leptomeningeal metastasis are generally excluded from clinical trials, thereby limiting the systematic assessment of novel therapies in this subgroup of patients with poor prognosis. More patients with leptomeningeal metastasis should be enrolled into trials investigating novel agents with the potential to penetrate the blood–brain barrier.

Novel approaches are being studied as currently available therapies are toxic and provide limited benefits.

== History ==
Neoplastic Meningitis (NM) was first reported in the 1870s.

== Gallery ==
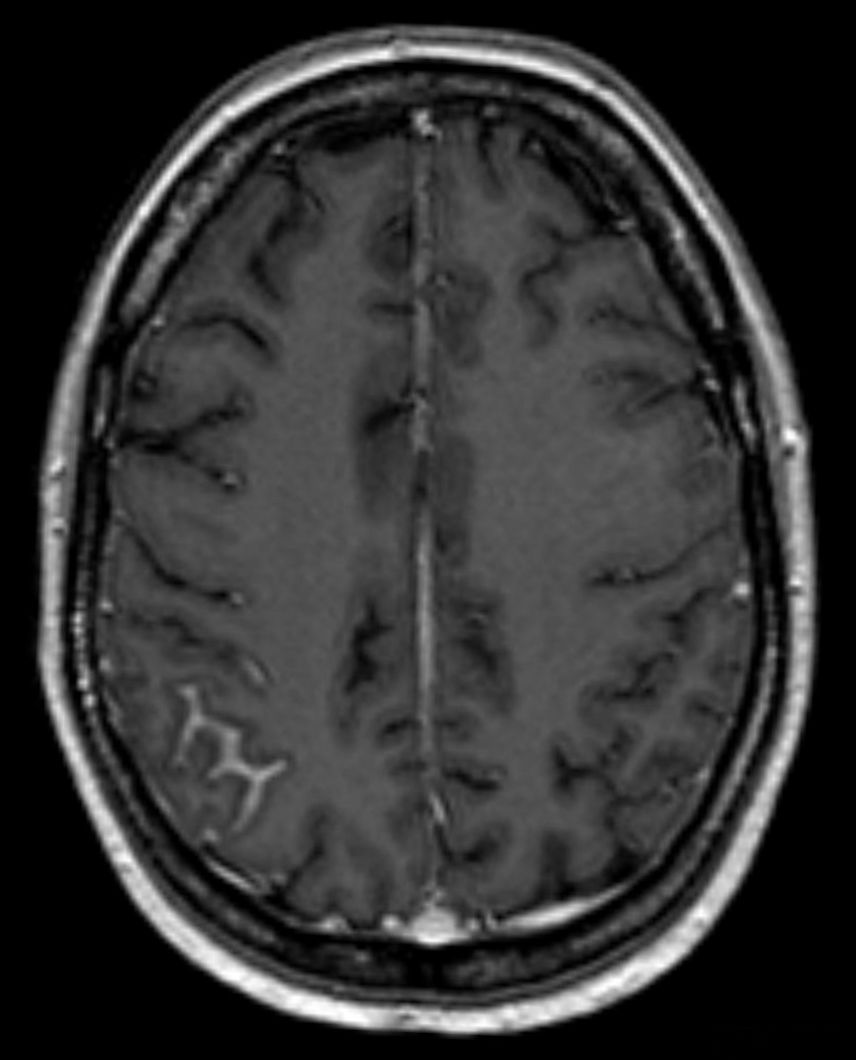
Meningeal carcinomatosis in a patient with breast cancer (contrast-enhanced axial T1-weighted MRI)
