= Linea splendens =

The linea splendens is a glistening band of longitudinal fibers that is made from thickening of the spinal pia mater along the surface of the anterior median fissure of the spinal cord. It forms a sheath for the anterior spinal artery and vein.
