= Cranial cavity =

Space inside the skull formed by eight cranial bones known as the neurocranium

- Body cavities

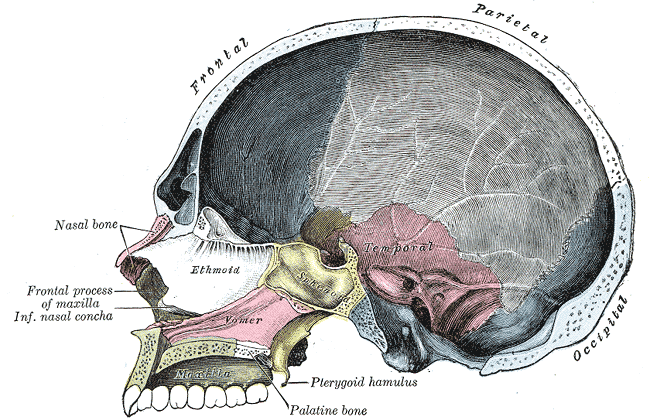
- Cranial cavity

Details
- Function: Supports and protects the brain

Identifiers
- Latin: cavitas cranii
- TA98: A01.1.00.048; A02.1.00.012
- TA2: 100, 413
- FMA: 9644

== The Cranial Cavity ==
The cranial cavity, also known as intracranial space, is the space within the skull that contains and protects the brain. The skull also known as the cranium, is formed by the eight cranial bones known as the neurocranium that in humans includes the skull cap. The rest of the bones in the skull are the facial skeleton. These facial bones help form the jaws, cheekbones, nasal cavity, and eye socket. The brain is also surrounded by three protective membranes called the meninges, which minimizes the damage done to the brain in the case of head trauma. Cerebrospinal fluid surrounds the brain and helps cushion the brain from injuries. Meningitis is the inflammation of meninges caused by bacterial or viral infections. It can cause symptoms such as a headache, fever, stiff neck, nausea, sensitivity to light and/or confusion. Considering meningitis can become serious very quickly, people who experience these symptoms should seek medical attention as soon as possible.

== Structure ==
The capacity of an adult human cranial cavity is 1,200–1,700 cm^{3}.

The spaces between meninges and the brain are filled with a clear cerebrospinal fluid, increasing the protection of the brain. Facial bones of the skull are not included in the cranial cavity. There are only eight cranial bones: The occipital, sphenoid, frontal, ethmoid, two parietal, and two temporal bones are fused together by the ossification of fixed fibrous sutures. The frontal and sphenoid bones are towards the front middle of the skull and in front of the temporal bone. The ethmoid bone is the bone at the roof of the nose that separates the nasal cavity from the brain. It is a part of the dorsal cavity, which also includes the spinal cord.". The occipital bone is at the back of the skull. The dorsal cavity is lined by the three meninges. The three meninges are the three membranes that envelop the brain and spinal cord, in which the central nervous system developed, which are the pia mater, the arachnoid mater, and the dura mater. The latter is the thickest and outermost of the three membrane layers; it contains the most collagen, and it is derived from the mesoderm - the middle germ layer or the primary layer of the cells formed in embryogenic development via epigenetic effects induced by developmental cues, in the early embryo. Also there are the two parietal bones and the two temporal bones, which are a part of the dorsal cavity located on the posterior of the body. The occipital bone found in the rear of the skull is thicker to limit fractures caused by blows to the back of the head. The eight bones are blended together to form the cranial cavity. The pituitary gland is also found in the make up of the cranial cavity. It plays a major role in the body, creating and secreting many bodily hormones. The gland secretes different fluids that are important for the body to function. The body's temperature, physical, and sexual functions are regulated by this gland. One of the major glands are controlled through this cavity.

The cerebrum is the most anterior part of the brain, located in the top half of the skull, consisting of two hemispheres separated by a fissure and connected by the corpus callosum. It is responsible for integrating complex sensory and neural functions, and subsequently initiating and coordinating voluntary activity in the body.

The cortex is the outer layer of the cerebrum, composed of folded grey matter. Its neuron cell bodies, dendrites, synapses, axons, and axon terminals play a crucial role in consciousness. The two hemispheres are divided into four lobes, distinct sections of the organ: the frontal lobe, parietal lobe, temporal lobe, and occipital lobe. Our understanding of the specific functions of the cerebral cortex are based on the theories of localisation and lateralisation. Localisation is the theory that specific areas of the brain are associated with/responsible for particular physical and psychological functions. Lateralisation is the theory that one hemisphere is dominant over the other/responsible for particular physical and psychological functions.

The meninges are the three membranes that line the skull and vertebral canal, and enclose the brain and spinal cord. The cerebrospinal fluid serves a vital function in the cerebral autoregulation of cerebral blood flow. Cerebrospinal fluid occupies the subarachnoid space and the ventricular system around and inside the brain and spinal cord.

== Function ==
There are twelve cranial nerves that are responsible for controlling the cranial cavity. These nerves are responsible for providing necessary sensory information for things such as smell, taste, hearing, and sight. The ability to sleep and chew is also a part of one of the things the cranial cavities in charge of. In order for the cranial cavity to be able to do all these functions it has to have the organs to be able to control those systems. The cranial cavity houses the Brain, Meninges, and the Cerebrospinal Fluid. The primary function of the brain is supplying information to the rest of the body and to help it function as whole. It helps supply some of the cranial nerves from the face to the feet and also to help get the body performing critical bodily functions.

The cranial cavity includes eight cranial bones and they are collectively combined to form this area. A gland that is found in this cavity is called the pituitary gland which secretes different fluids that are necessary for different parts of the body to function. There are many things that are regulated by this gland such as body temperature, physical growth, and sexual functions. The pituitary gland also controls the thyroid gland.

The cranial cavity has a variety of spinal and cranial nerves residing in it. The cranial nerves are responsible for storing sensory information needed for taste, smell, sight and the ability to hear. The spinal nerves allow for the sensory and motor signals to be received, which provide a normal feeling and function for the arms and legs.

== Clinical significance ==
In the event that the brain strikes the inside of the skull, there is a risk of a minor traumatic brain injury (concussion). This type of injury can alter brain function, cause memory loss, headaches and/or nausea. A minor traumatic brain injury can be followed by post concussion syndrome. As there are a number of structures in the cranial cavity, a traumatic injury to the head can potentially cause major damage to the brain. This is why it is recommended to get medical attention following a head injury.

The cranial cavity houses the meninges, as well as other necessary organs, and these membranes surround the central nervous system. If an infection forms, it can lead to a disease called meningitis which can be potentially fatal.

== The Facial Bones ==
The facial skeleton is made up of 14 bones that form the structure of the face. These bones include pairs and two single bones. The paired bones are the maxillae, zygomatic bones, nasal bones, lacrimal bones, palatine bones, and inferior nasal conchae. The two single bones are the mandible and vomer. These bones are part of the cranial cavity, but they do not form the cranial cavity itself. The cranial cavity is formed by the cranial bones that surround the brain.

The maxillae forms the upper jaw and part of the hard palate, while the mandible Forms the lower jaw and helps with chewing. The zygomatic bones form the cheeckbones, and the nasal bones help form the bridge of the nose. The lacrimal bones are two small bones in each eye socket that helo from the inner wall of the eyes. The palatine bones form the back part of the hard palate, which separates the mouth from the nasal cavity. The inferior nasal conchae are located inside the nasal cavity and helps direct the airflow. The vomer Forms part of the nasal septum, which separates the nasal cavity into two sides.

== See also ==
- Intracranial pressure
- Paranasal sinuses
