= Parisa Saboori =

Iranian-American biomechanical engineer

Parisa Saboori is an Iranian-American biomechanical engineer whose research interests include modeling the arachnoid trabeculae in the human brain and understanding traumatic brain injury from shocks to the brain. She has also studied injuries to the anterior cruciate ligament of the human knee, especially in women's sports. She works at Manhattan University, a private Catholic university in New York City, as a professor of mechanical engineering, chair of the Department of Mechanical Engineering, and Distinguished Lasallian-Educator.

== Education and career ==
Saboori has a bachelor's degree in mechanical engineering from Bu-Ali Sina University in Hamadan, Iran. Before shifting to biomechanical engineering, she worked for many years in the oil industry.

After emigrating to the United States in 2004, she continued her studies in mechanical engineering at the City College of New York of the City University of New York, where she received a master's degree and completed her Ph.D. Her 2022 dissertation, Mechanotransduction of Head Impacts to the Brain Leading to TBI: Histology and Architecture of Subarachnoid Space, was supervised by Ali Sadegh.

She has been a faculty member at Manhattan University (until 2024 known as Manhattan College) since 2011.

== Recognition ==
Saboori was named a Distinguished Lasallian-Educator of Manhattan University in 2019. She was elected as an ASME Fellow by the American Society of Mechanical Engineers (ASME) in 2020, and was the 2023 recipient of the ASME Outstanding Student Section Advisor Award.

== Personal life ==
Saboori is Mandaean, and is active in New York's Mandaean community.
