= Anterior median fissure =

Anterior median fissure may refer to:

- Anterior median fissure of the spinal cord
- Anterior median fissure of the medulla oblongata
