= Pelvic tumor =

A pelvic tumor is any one of the numerous tumors that occur in the pelvis. Within the pelvis, these tumors may involve specific organs or tend to occupy intra-organ spaces. Tumors found in the presacral space and sacral space are most prevalent in children. Tumors occupying specific organs have a more complex natural history. Different tumors have different symptoms. Some pelvic tumors produce a sensation of heaviness in the pelvic area.

== Tumors occupying specific organs ==
- Bladder cancer
- Prostate cancer
- Rectal cancer
- Anal cancer
- Ovarian cancer
- Uterine cancer
- Sacrococcygeal teratoma

== Tumors occupying intra-organ spaces ==
Presacral space:

- Teratoma

Sacral space (in approximate order of prevalence):

- Teratoma
- Lipoma
- Ganglioneuroma
- Myxopapillary ependymoma
- Primitive neuroectodermal tumor
- Aneurysmal bone cyst
- Ewing's sarcoma
- Metastases from brain stem tumors (medulloblastoma, ependymoma, high-grade astrocytoma)

== Complications ==
- Urinary incontinence
- Fecal incontinence
