= Radiation-induced lumbar plexopathy =

Type of nerve damage

The lumbosacral nerves
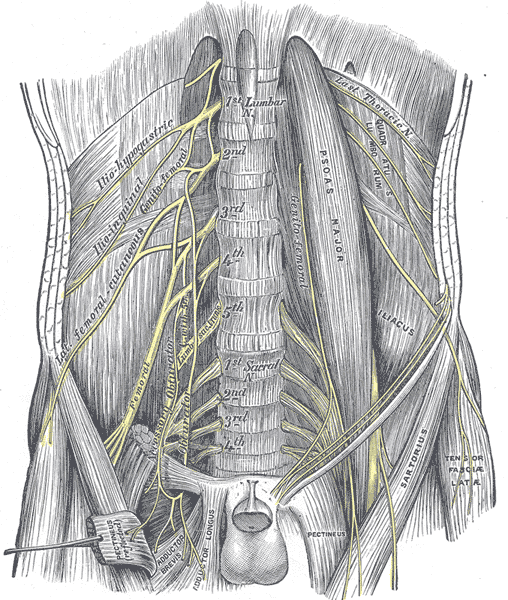
- Lumbar plexus and its branches

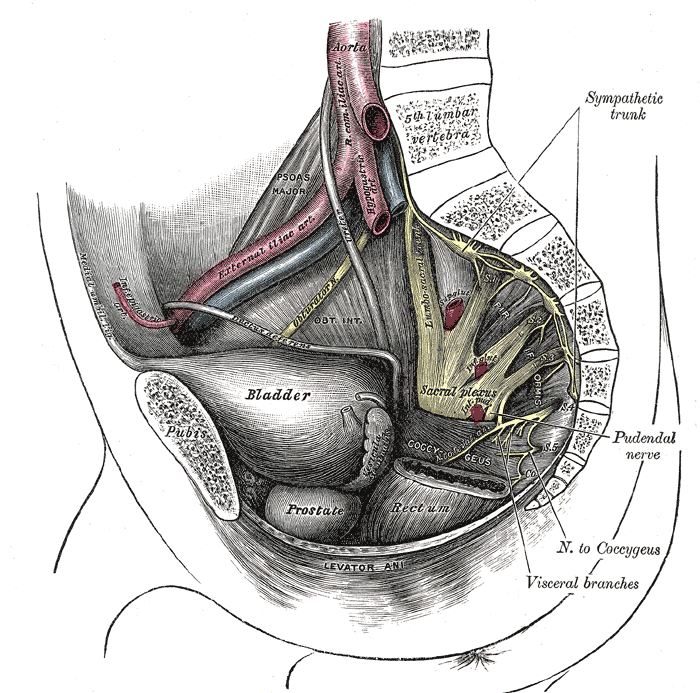
- Dissection of pelvis showing sacral and pudendal plexuses

Radiation-induced lumbar plexopathy (RILP) or radiation-induced lumbosacral plexopathy (RILSP) is nerve damage in the pelvis and lower spine area caused by therapeutic radiation treatments. RILP is a rare side effect of external beam radiation therapy and both interstitial and intracavity brachytherapy radiation implants. RILP is a Pelvic Radiation Disease symptom.

In general terms, such nerve damage may present in stages, earlier as demyelination and later as complications of chronic radiation fibrosis. RILP occurs as a result of radiation therapy administered to treat lymphoma or cancers within the abdomen or pelvic area such as cervical, ovarian, bladder, kidney, pancreatic, prostate, testicular, colorectal, colon, rectal or anal cancer. The lumbosacral plexus area is radiosensitive and radiation plexopathy can occur after exposure to mean or maximum radiation levels of 50-60 Gray with a significant rate difference noted within that range.

== Signs and symptoms ==
Lumbosacral plexopathy is characterized by any of the following symptoms; usually bi-lateral and symmetrical, though unilateral is known.

- Lower limb dysaesthesia, abnormal sensations of touch or feeling
- Lower limb weakness
- Lower limb numbness
- Lower limb paresthesia, e.g., foot drop, muscle atrophy
- Lower limb neuropathic pain

Symptoms are typically a step-wise progression with periods of stability in between, weakness often appearing years later. Weakness frequently presents in the lower leg muscle groups. Symptoms are usually irreversible.

Initial onset of symptoms may occur as early as 2 to 3 months after radiotherapy. The median onset is approximately 5 years, but can be highly variable, 2-3 decades after radiation therapy. One case study recorded the initial onset occurring 36 years post treatment.

== Cause ==
The treatment's ionizing radiation is an activation mechanism for apoptosis (cell death) within the targeted cancer, but it can also impact nearby healthy radiosensitive tissues, like the lumbosacral plexus. Plexopathy and neuropathic pain occurring after radiation is associated with ischemic demyelination and perineural fibrosis. The occurrence and severity of RILP is related to the magnitude of ionizing radiation and the peripheral nerves' radiosensitivity and may be further aggravated if combined with chemotherapy consisting of taxanes and platinum drugs.

== Pathophysiology ==
The pathophysiological process behind radiation's RILP nerve damage has been discussed since the 1960s and is still without a precise definition. Consensus does exist on a progression of RILP symptoms, with a stepping (a time delay) between two periods of plexopathy onset, the first from radiation injury and the later from fibrosis. Proposed mechanisms of the early nerve damage include microvascular damage (ischemia) supplying the myelin, radiation damage of the myelin, and oxygen free radical cell damage. Some plexopathies arising within the first year post-RT respond to corticosteroids and may recover. This variation is presumed to be from radiation injury of the Schwann cells forming the myelin sheaths and demyelination (loss of axon insulation). Later delayed nerve damage is attributed to compression neuropathy and a late fibro-atrophic ischemia from retractile fibrosis.

== Diagnosis ==
The more common source of lumbar plexopathy is a direct or secondary tumor involvement of the plexus with MRI being the typical confirmation tool. Tumors typically present with enhancement of nerve roots and T2-weighted hyperintensity. The differential consideration of RILP requires taking a medical history and neurologic examination.

RILP's neurological symptoms can mimic other nerve disorders. People may present with pure lower motor neuron syndrome, a symptom of amyotrophic lateral sclerosis (ALS). RILP may also be misdiagnosed as leptomeningeal metastasis often showing nodular MRI enhancement of the cauda equina nerve roots or having increased CSF protein content.

Other differential diagnoses to consider are Chronic Inflammatory Demyelinating Polyradiculoneuropathy, neoplastic lumbosacral plexopathy, paraneoplastic neuronopathy, diabetic lumbosacral plexopathy, degenerative disk disease (osteoporosis of the spine), Osteoarthritis of the spine, Lumbar Spinal Stenosis, post-infectious plexopathy, carcinomatous meningitis (CM), mononeuritis multiplex, and chemotherapy-induced plexopathy.

The testing to resolve a RILP diagnosis involves blood serum analysis, X-rays, EMG, MRI and cerebrospinal fluid analysis.

== Prevention ==
Since RILP's neurological changes are typically irreversible and a curative strategy has yet to be defined, prevention is the best approach. Treating the primary cancer remains an obvious requirement, but lower levels of lumbar plexus radiation dosing will minimize or eliminate RILP.

One method to reduce the lumbosacral plexus' dosing is to include it with other at-risk organs that get spared from radiation, albeit the lumbosacral plexus it is not generally recognized as an organ at risk (OAR).

Key to prevention is resolving the lack of clinical evidence between radiation treatments and the onset of neurological problems. That relationship is hidden by RILP's low toxicity rate, the lack of a large monitored population size and the lack of data pooling across multiple institutions.

== Management ==
Treatment of RILP is primarily supportive with mental, physiological and social aspects and consideration of any aggravating (synergistic) neurological factors.

To prevent compounding existing RILP symptoms and to minimize further progression

- Remove co-morbidity factors
  - control diabetes and hypertension
  - avoid excessive alcohol use
  - avoiding any local trauma in the irradiated volume
  - controlling acute edema
- control acute inflammation. Pharmaceuticals are effective for inflammation, like corticosteroids (e.g. Dexamethasone), though have limited additional benefit mediating chronic plexus disorders.
- avoid stretching a plexus immobilized by fibrosis, e.g., carrying heavy loads or extensive movements, which may cause sudden neurological decompensation.

The effect on the person with the condition, depends upon the type of impairment. Handicaps may include physical challenges, bowel and/or bladder dysfunction and may occur in multiple settings of work and home. Physical and occupational therapy are important elements in maintaining mobility and use of the lower extremities, along with assistive aides such as Ankle-Foot-Orthotics (AFOs), cane, walkers, etc. Sensory reeducation techniques may be necessary for balance and lymphedema management may be required.

Common NSAID analgesics used for nociceptive pain are less effective against neuropathic pain, originating from the somatosensory system's mechanoreceptors. Pharmaceuticals that may be beneficial are:

- Tricyclic antidepressants (TCAs) (amitriptyline)
- Antiepileptics or antiseizure (gabapentin, pregabalin, carbamazepine, valproic acid)
- Selective serotonin re-uptake inhibitors (SSRIs) act upon a single neurotransmitters to preserve normal norepinephrine and serotonin levels
- Serotonin–norepinephrine reuptake inhibitors (SNRIs) are MRIs that act upon multiple neurotransmitters
- Analgesic drugs (pregabalin, methadone, capsaicin)
- Antiarrhythmics (lidocaine, mexilitine)
- Opiates may be used singularly or to potentate the concomitant use of TCAs.

Non-pharmaceutical RILP considerations are:

- acupuncture for pain
- massage for pain
- Transcutaneous electrical nerve stimulation (TENS) for pain
- Benzodiazepines may be used for paraesthesia.
- Quinine may be used for cramps.

Functional impairment and residual pain can lead to social isolation. Cancer support groups are valuable resources to learn about the syndrome and therapeutic options, and are a means to voice emotions related to having cancer and surviving it.

== Outcomes ==
With increasing cancer treatment survival rates, the quality of life for its survivors has become a public health priority. The effects of RILP can be debilitating. With no effective treatment to control radiation damage's progressive nature, limb dysfunction is the likely result.

Radiation damage's outcome is related to its initial onset time.

- Acute symptoms, occurring in the first few days, have the most favorable outcomes, likely diminishing within a few weeks.
- Early-delayed symptoms, occurring within the first months, typically include myelopathy. These issues frequently resolve without treatment.
- Late-delayed symptoms, occurring several months or years after treatment, may also include myelopathy, but its severity level is more likely to worsen, resulting in permanent paralysis. Significant neurologic morbidity is typical, with a very slow neurologic recovery.

== Epidemiology ==
An exact occurrence rate has not been established. Literature on the topic is sparse. Clinical occurrences of RILP are rare, affecting between 0.3 and 1.3% of those treated with abdominal or pelvic radiation. The incidence rate is variable, dependent upon the irradiated zone, dosage level and method of delivery. For example, when alternate dosing levels were compared, higher rates were observed, from 12 to 23%, the higher RILP rates occurring with higher dosages.

== History ==
As of 1977 lumbosacral neuropathy arising from radiation therapy had been rarely reported. One of the earliest cases was in 1948.

The incidence rate of peripheral neuropathy has been demonstrated to decrease when lower therapeutic radiation dosing levels are used. A similar nerve injury, Radiation-induced Brachial Plexopathy (RIBP), may occur secondary to breast radiation therapy. Studies on RIBP have observed the brachial plexus' radiosensitivity. Injury was observed after dosages of 40 Gy in 20 fractions and RIBP significantly increased with doses greater than 2 Gy per fraction. RIBP is more common than lumbosacral radiculoplexopathy and has a clinical history with reduced dosing levels. RIBP occurrence rates were in the 60% range in the 1960s when 60 Gray treatments were applied in 5 Gray fractions; RIBP occurrences in the 2010s approach 1% with 50 Gray treatments applied in 3 Gy fractions.

RILP occurrence rates are estimated at 0.3% to 1.3%, though the actual rate is likely higher. The soft tissue damage leading to RILP is more commonly seen with exposure levels over 50 Gy, though has occurred with as little as 30 Gy. A major step toward reducing RILP occurrences is by limiting the lumbosacral plexus' dosing level when treating pelvic malignancies, limiting the mean dose to < 45 Gy. One approach to reduced levels, the plexus' mapping with other organs at risk, was clinically evaluated during the 2010s.

Clinical evidence of the cause-and-effect for prevention and the management of radiation induced polyneuropathy is limited.

In 2011 the Radiation Oncology Institute (ROI) announced the National Radiation Oncology Registry (NROR). ROI and Massachusetts General Hospital would initially focus the NROR on prostate cancer, collecting efficacy and side effect information (like radiation induced neuropathy, RILP) from people treated with radiotherapy. In 2013 the American Society for Radiation Oncology (ASTRO) joined the effort and the number of data collection sites increased to 30 for a 1-year pilot project. Pitfalls of medical data collection arose with only 14 sites being able to provide data and all those requiring significant manual entry efforts. The first NROR project conclusion was that future registries would need to cope with Big data analytics. In 2015 ASTRO, the National Cancer Institute and the American Association of Physicists in Medicine sponsored a Big Data Workshop at the National Institutes of Health.

== Research ==
Experimental approaches for RILP treatment and management include:

- Hyperbaric oxygen (HBO) has had mixed results restoring nerve function, some studies showing benefit, others without.
- Drug-infusion therapy was used in 2018 to treat a chronic, intractable neuropathic pain case unresolved by conventional pharmacological means. Lidocaine, an accepted sodium ion channel blocker, was intravenously administered in three sessions with progressively positive outcomes of reduced pain and base-line opioid consumption. Infusion therapy was proposed as a rescue-treatment component within classical multimodal pain treatment guidelines. A 2022 follow-up metadata review of intravenous lidocaine use found efficacy limited to complex regional pain syndrome and cancer pain, though beneficial for chronic post-surgical pain; it recommended future evaluation.
- Current neuropathic pain pharmacological management has focused on suppressing neuronal excitability (muting ion channel activity with gabapentin, pregabalin, etc.) or enhancing endogenous inhibitory mechanisms (e.g. antidepressants). Neuropathic pain pathophysiological studies highlight an alternate target, the significant immune response to nerve injury, both at injury onset and with later persistent pain. Targeting glia and its relationship with the peripheral immune cells could reduce the adverse neurobiological consequences fostering persistent pain. Preclinical research supports the importance of glia in pain pathogenesis. A 2024 systematic review found twenty-six trials (2132 participants) evaluating glia-modulating drugs. Pain reduction outcomes were only slightly positive: 6 trials reporting positive; 11, mixed; and 9, no effect. The review did not prove efficacy for the current drugs and their selected targets but offered suggestions for future clinical trials.
- Anticoagulant therapy (warfin, heparin) has been tried for ischemia and capillary restoration, some without clear benefit, others with improved motor function.
- PENTOCLO therapy- a combination of Pentoxifylline (PTX), vitamin E and clodronate, a bisphosphanate; the PTX for inflammation, vitamin E as a scavenger for oxygen free radicals that can lead to fibrosis and clodronate which may inhibit myelin nerve destruction.
- Myofascial release may reduce compressive effects of fibrouses, freeing trapped nerves.
- Mobilization of injured limbs via exoskeletal systems or hybrid assistive devices can provide the mobility lost to nerve damage, offering a workaround until new medical therapies e.g. tissue engineering can repair peripheral nerve injury.

== See also ==
- Radiation poisoning
- Radiation therapy
- ICD-10-CM World Health Organization's Code G62.82: Radiation-induced polyneuropathy
- ICD-11-MMS (2018 version) World Health Organization's Code 8B92.0: Post radiation lumbosacral plexopathy
