= Plexopathy =

Nervous system disorder

Plexopathy is a disorder of the network of nerves in the brachial or lumbosacral plexus. Symptoms include pain, muscle weakness, and sensory deficits (numbness).

== Types ==
There are two main types of plexopathy, based on the location of the symptoms: brachial plexopathy (affecting the arm) and lumbosacral plexopathy (affecting the leg).

== Cause ==
Brachial plexopathy is often caused from local trauma to the brachial plexus, as can happen from a dislocated shoulder. The disorder can also be secondary to compression or stretching of the brachial plexus (for example, during a baby's transit through the birth canal, in which case it may be referred to as Erb's Palsy or Klumpke's palsy). Non-traumatic causes of brachial plexopathy include diabetes, malignancy, and infection. Brachial plexopathy can also be idiopathic with an unknown cause, in which case it is known as Parsonage-Turner Syndrome. Both brachial and lumbosacral plexopathy can also occur as a consequence of radiation therapy, sometimes after 30 or more years have passed, in conditions known as Radiation-induced Brachial Plexopathy (RIBP) and Radiation-induced Lumbosacral Plexopathy (RILP).

== Diagnosis ==
The first steps in the evaluation and management of plexopathy involve a medical provider obtaining a medical history and conducting a physical examination. Diagnosis of plexopathy relies on proper identification of a pattern in motor and sensory function deficits in the upper or lower extremities.

To rule out confounding conditions such as radiculopathy or myelopathy, an MRI of the cervical or lumbar spine is often obtained. If plexopathy is suspected after imaging, an EMG performed by a neurologist or physiatrist can help confirm a plexopathy, and clarify the localization within the brachial or lumbosacral plexus. Following electrodiagnostic testing, further imaging may be obtained of relevant soft tissue structures with either ultrasound or MRI. Some blood tests may help identify the cause of the plexopathy, including screening for diabetes, and obtaining a complete blood count (CBC) and a comprehensive metabolic panel (CMP).

== Treatment ==
Management of brachial or lumbosacral plexopathy depends on the underlying cause. No matter the cause of plexopathy, physical therapy and/or occupational therapy may promote recovery of strength and improve limb function. In the case of a mass lesion causing compression of the brachial or lumbosacral plexus, surgical decompression may be warranted. In an idiopathic brachial plexopathy, no specific treatment is usually indicated, although there is limited evidence that steroids may hasten recovery. If a brachial or lumbosacral plexopathy is determined to be caused by diabetes, management includes controlling the patient's blood sugar. For radiation-induced plexopathies, treatment options are often limited to pain/symptom management and provision of assistive devices.

== See also ==
- Plexus
- Nerve plexus
- Radiculopathy
