= Arachnoid trabeculae =

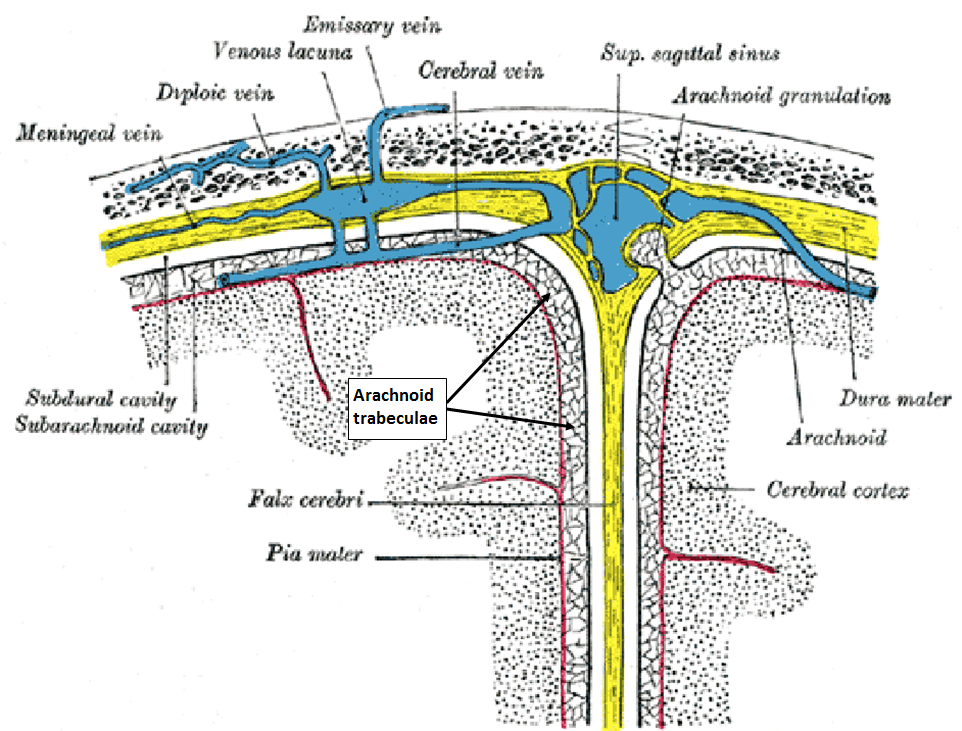
- The arachnoid trabeculae connecting the arachnoid and pial layers of the meninges

Identifiers
- TA98: A14.1.01.206
- TA2: 5390
- FMA: 77761

The arachnoid trabeculae (AT) are delicate strands of connective tissue that loosely connect the two innermost layers of the meninges – the arachnoid mater and the pia mater. They are found within the subarachnoid space where cerebrospinal fluid is also found. Arachnoid trabeculae are also known as subarachnoid trabeculae (SAT) or leptomeningeal trabeculae.

== Structure ==
Human cranial arachnoid trabeculae are made mostly of type I collagen. A study of 7 post-mortem human brains found that average trabecula fiber width was 30μm, and the average volume fraction was 26%.

Arachnoid trabeculae are surrounded by fibroblast cells. There are five principal architectures of arachnoid trabeculae structures, whose shapes may be described as single strands, branched strands, tree-like shapes, sheets, and trabecular networks. Some authors describe the structures in the subarachnoid space as having three forms, namely "trabeculae", "septa" and "pillars".

The arachnoid trabeculae structures of humans and rats have been shown to have similar morphology. Therefore many studies of AT use rats instead of humans. Also AT embryology is similar in humans and mice.

== Function ==
The arachnoid trabeculae help limit displacement of the brain relative to the skull. The region-dependence of trabeculae volume fraction has a strong influence on the magnitude and distribution of brain deformation in the event of head impact.

== Development ==
Embryologically, the arachnoid trabeculae are the remnants of the common precursor that forms both the arachnoid and pial layers of the meninges. The initial development of the subarachnoid space occurs in two phases:

1. A mesenchymal layer "invades" between the embryonic epithelium and the developing neuroepithelium of the telencephalon. The extracellular space is filled with GAG (glycosaminoglycan) gel.
2. The trabecular structure arises from withdrawal of the GAG gel. This results in fluid-filled cavities with random spacing and size. The mesenchymal material between these cavities is the origin of the arachnoid trabeculae. The upper and lower surfaces of the layer become the arachnoid and pia mater membranes, to which the trabecular structure remains attached.

Above the subarachnoid space, collagen fibers from the trabeculae are attached to the arachnoid mater, reinforcing it with collagen to withstand fairly strong forces. Below the subarachnoid space, trabecular collagen passes through the pia mater and sub-pial space, and is attached to the basement membrane, beneath which it embeds itself in a layer of astrocytes and oligodendrocytes.

== See also ==
- Subarachnoid cisterns
- Subarachnoid hemorrhage
- Trabecula
- Arachnoid granulation, also known as arachnoid villi
- Dura mater
