= Presacral space =

Anatomical space in the lower abdomen

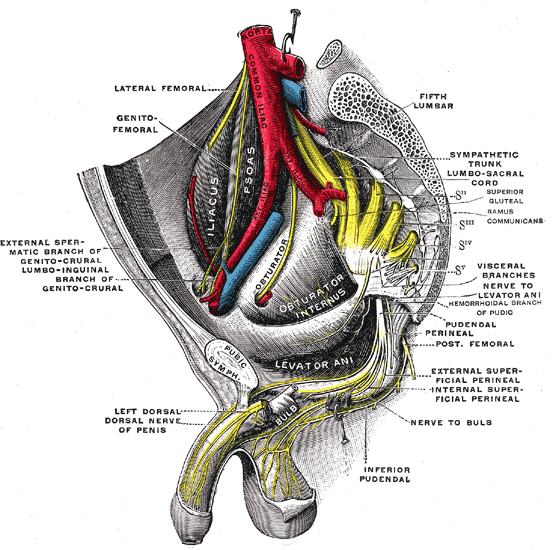
- Sacral plexus of the right side. (Presacral space visible but not labeled.)

In human anatomy, the presacral space is inside the pelvis, behind the rectum and in front of the coccyx and sacrum. Normally it is empty, or it contains a pocket of fat.

It is usually covered by sigmoid colon.

== Clinical significance ==
The presacral space may contain one of several kinds of tumor. The most common tumor here is sacrococcygeal teratoma. Others are retrorectal hamartoma (tailgut cyst), schwannoma, ganglioneuroma, and ependymoma. Also sometimes found here is an anterior meningocele, a relatively mild form of neural tube defect.

Causes of increased pre-sacral space are: ulcerative colitis, granulomatous colitis, lymphogranuloma venereum, and in postirradiation changes, thrombosis of the inferior vena cava and tuberculous proctitis, tumor of the sacrum or posterior wall of the rectum. Carcinomatous deposits in the pelvis can also cause presacral space widening.

Presacral edema is common in patients with heart failure who are confined to bed.

== Additional images ==
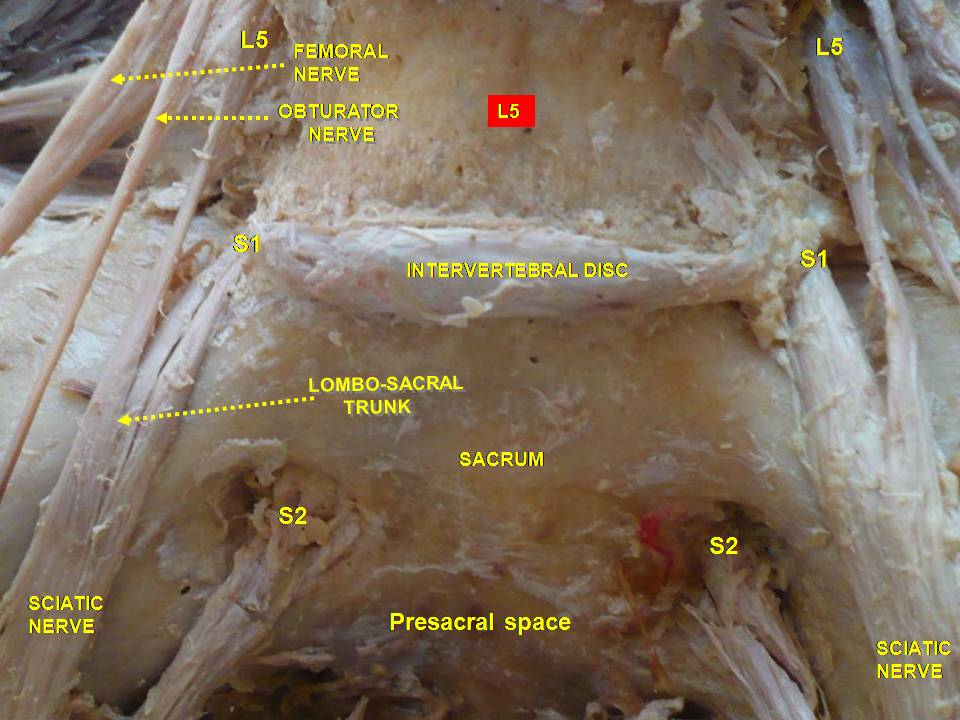
Presacral space.Deep dissection. Anterior view.
