= Arachnoid mater =

Web-like middle layer of the three meninges

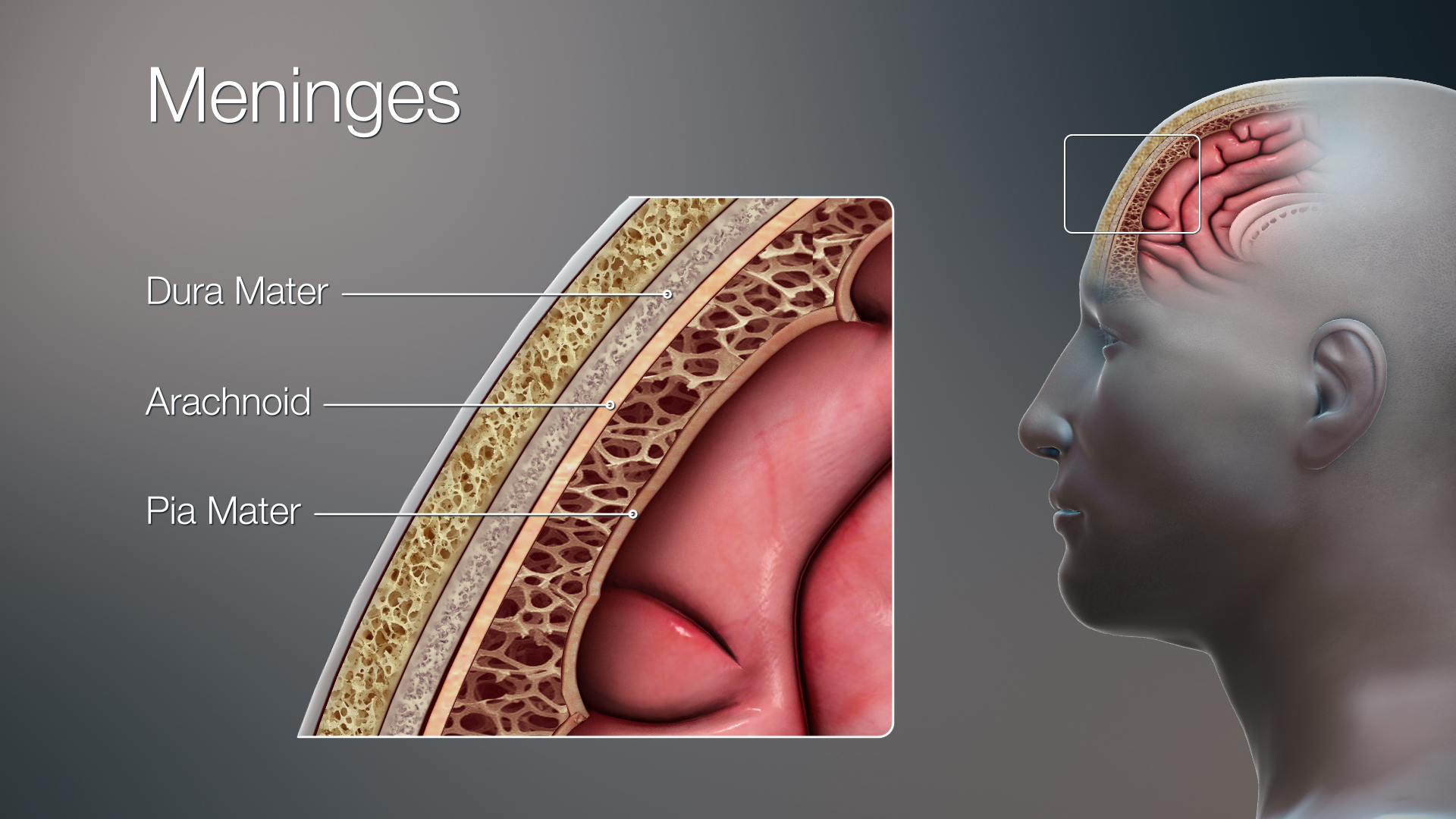
- Image showing arachnoid mater and the underlying subarachnoid space

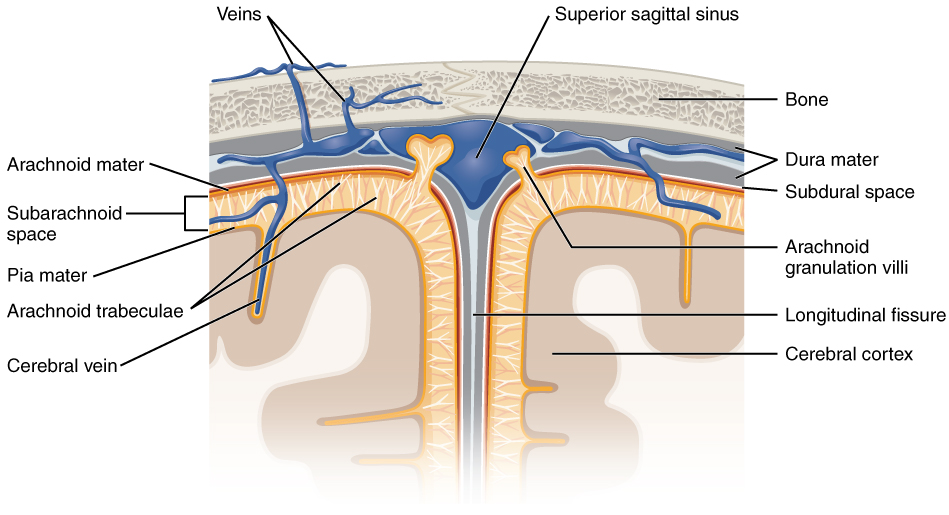
- Image showing parts of the arachnoid mater, including arachnoid granulations.

Details
- Part of: Meninges

Identifiers
- Latin: arachnoidea mater
- MeSH: D001099
- NeuroNames: 1464
- TA98: A14.1.01.201
- TA2: 5386
- FMA: 9591

The arachnoid mater (or simply arachnoid) is one of the three meninges, the protective membranes that cover the brain and spinal cord. It is so named because of its resemblance to a spider web. The arachnoid mater is a derivative of the neural crest mesoectoderm in the embryo.

== Structure ==
The arachnoid mater is interposed between the two other meninges, the more superficial (closer to the surface) and much thicker dura mater and the deeper pia mater, from which it is separated by the subarachnoid space. The delicate arachnoid layer is not attached to the inside of the dura but against it, and surrounds the brain and spinal cord. It does not line the brain down into its sulci (folds), as does the pia mater, with the exception of the longitudinal fissure, which divides the left and right cerebral hemispheres. Cerebrospinal fluid (CSF) flows under the arachnoid in the subarachnoid space, within a meshwork of trabeculae which span between the arachnoid and the pia. The arachnoid mater makes arachnoid villi, small protrusions through the dura mater into the venous sinuses of the brain, which allow CSF to exit the subarachnoid space and enter the blood stream.

Unlike the dura mater, which receives a rich vascular supply from numerous arteries, the arachnoid mater is avascular (lacking blood vessels).

The arachnoid mater and dura mater are very close together throughout the cranium and spinal canal all the way to sacral vertebra S2, where the two layers fuse into one and end in the filum terminale, which attaches to the coccygeal end of the spinal canal. Sandwiched between the dura and arachnoid maters lie some veins that connect the brain's venous system with the venous system in the dura mater.

The arachnoid mater covering the brain is referred to as the arachnoidea encephali, and the portion covering the spinal cord as the arachnoidea spinalis. The arachnoid and pia mater are sometimes considered as a single structure, the leptomeninx, or the plural version, leptomeninges (lepto, from the Greek root meaning "thin" or "slender"). Similarly, the dura in this situation is called the pachymeninx.

There are two subdivisions of arachnoid mater surrounding the subarachnoid space, the dorsal layer and the ventral layer. The dorsal layer covers internal cerebral veins and fixes them to the surrounding tela choroidea. The ventral layer of arachnoid membrane, on the other hand, is a direct anterior extension of this arachnoid envelope that the dorsal layer forms over the pineal region.

The arachnoid mater in the rat is composed of approximately 10 layers of fibroblast cells.

== Function ==
CSF circulates in the subarachnoid space (between arachnoid and pia mater). Cerebrospinal fluid is produced by the choroid plexus (inside the ventricles of the brain, which are in direct communication with the subarachnoid space so the CSF can flow freely through the nervous system). Cerebrospinal fluid is a transparent, colourless fluid and it is produced at about 500 ml/day. Its electrolyte levels, glucose levels, and pH are very similar to those in plasma, but the presence of blood in cerebrospinal fluid is always abnormal.

== Etymology ==
The arachnoid mater is named after the Greek word arachne ("spider"), the suffix -oid ("in the image of"), and the Latin word mater ("mother"), because of the fine spider-web–like appearance of the delicate fibres of the arachnoid (arachnoid trabeculae) which extend down through the subarachnoid space and attach to the pia mater.

The introduction of the name "arachnoid mater" is attributed to Frederik Ruysch in 1699. Another source states that the "arachnoid membrane" was discovered and named by Gerardus Blaes (Blasius) in 1664, and that Ruysch adopted the term in 1692.

== Additional images ==
Meninges

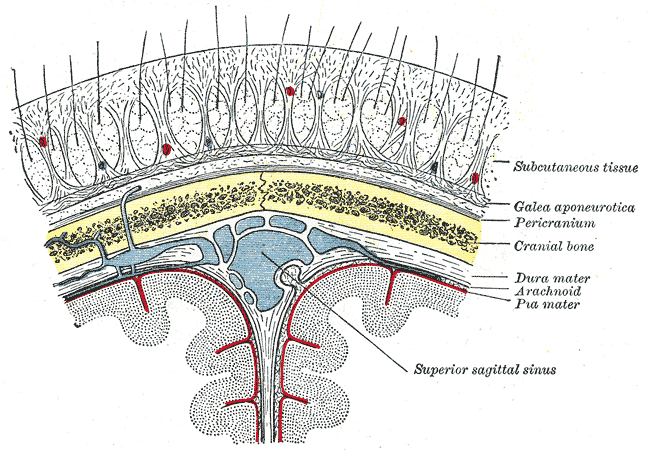
Diagrammatic section of scalp.

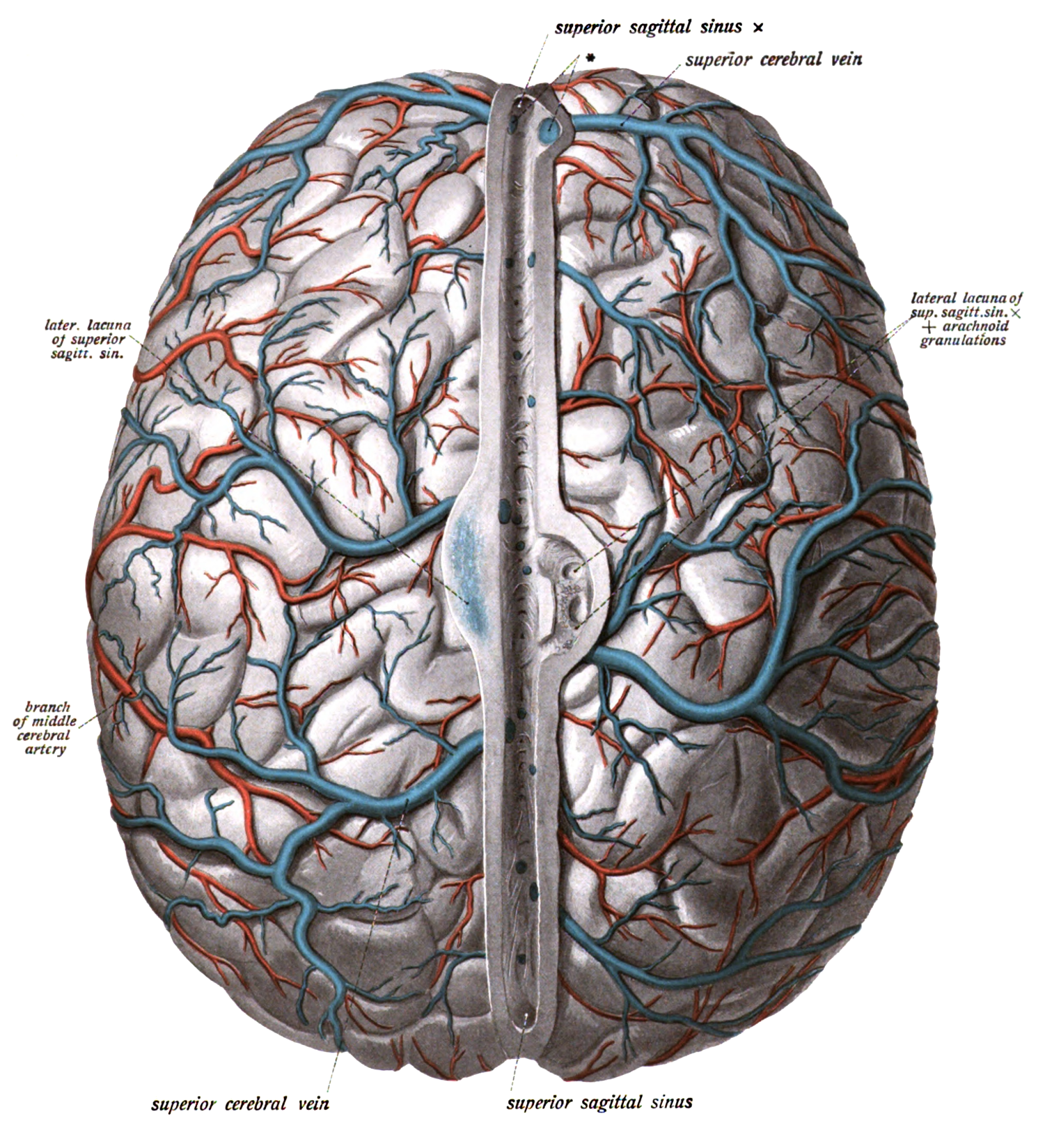
The arachnoid mater lies under the dura mater, and arteries and veins run on top of it.

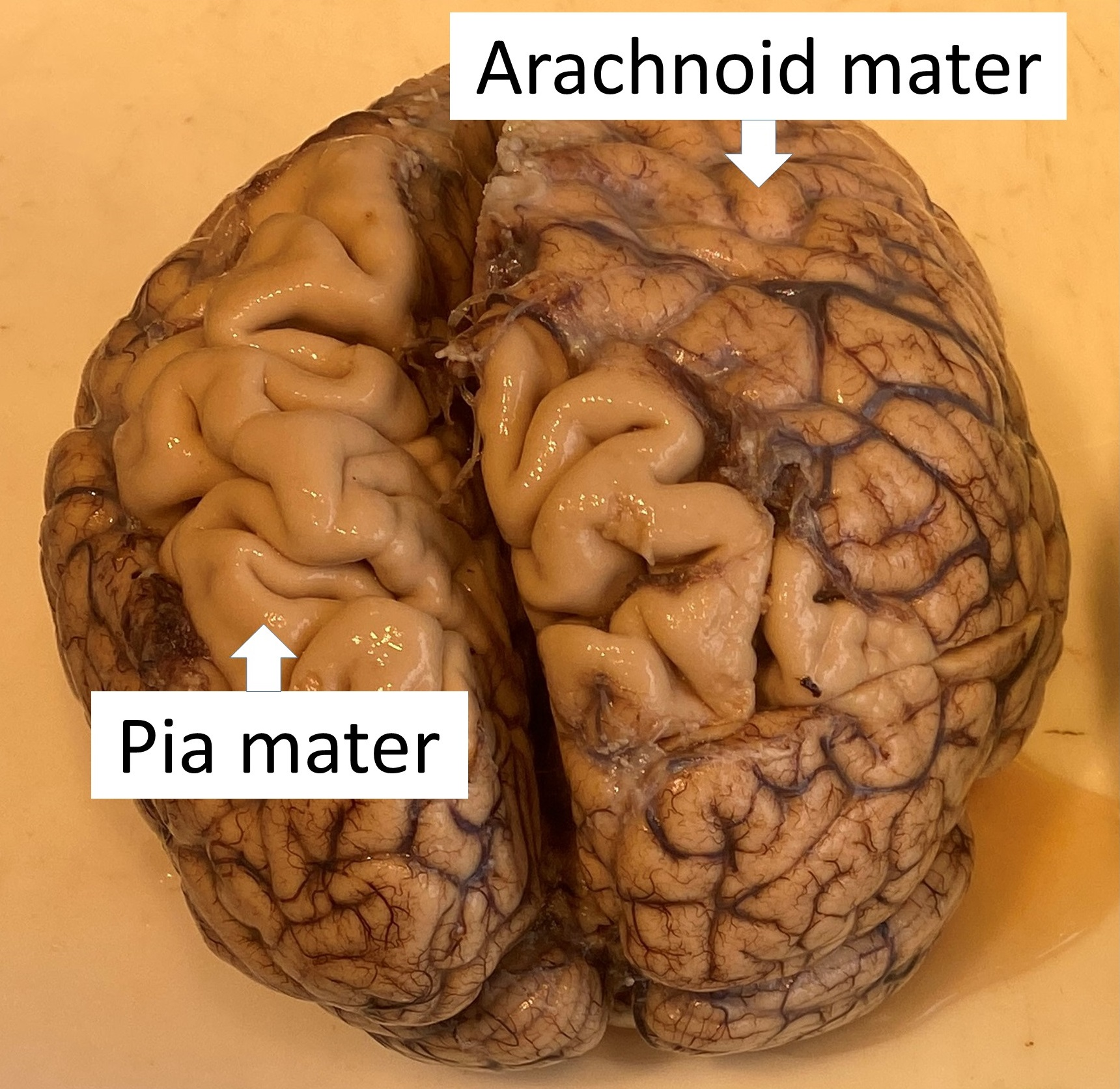
Brain with arachnoid mater, and an area where it is removed, showing cerebral gyri covered by the translucent pia mater.

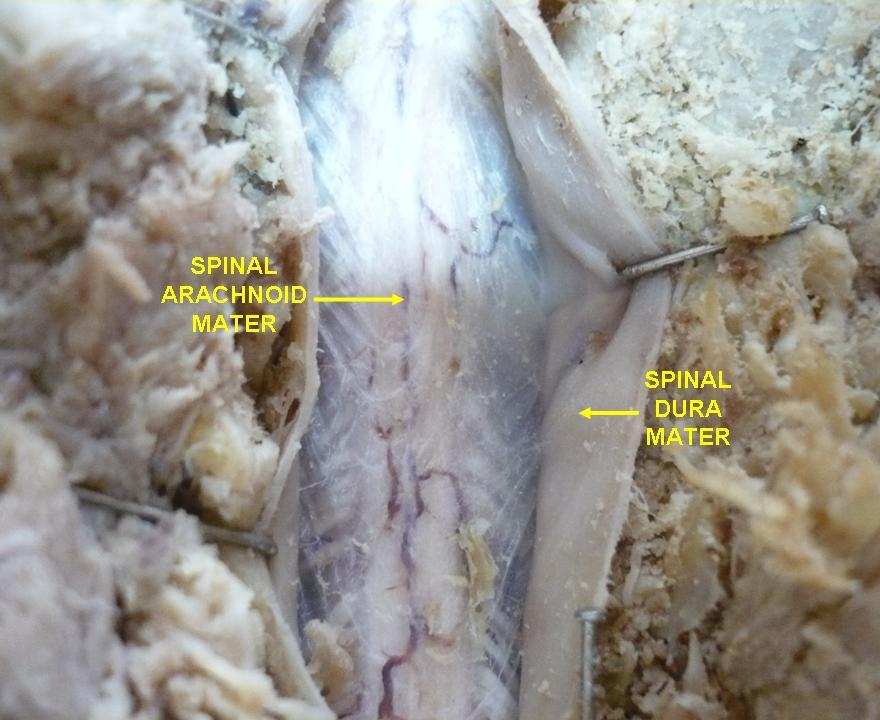
Spinal dura mater opened, arachnoid mater visible.

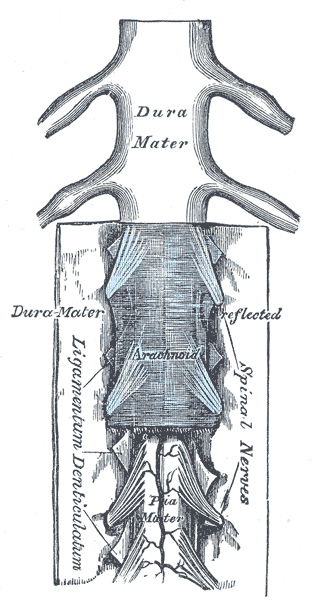
The medulla spinalis and its membranes.

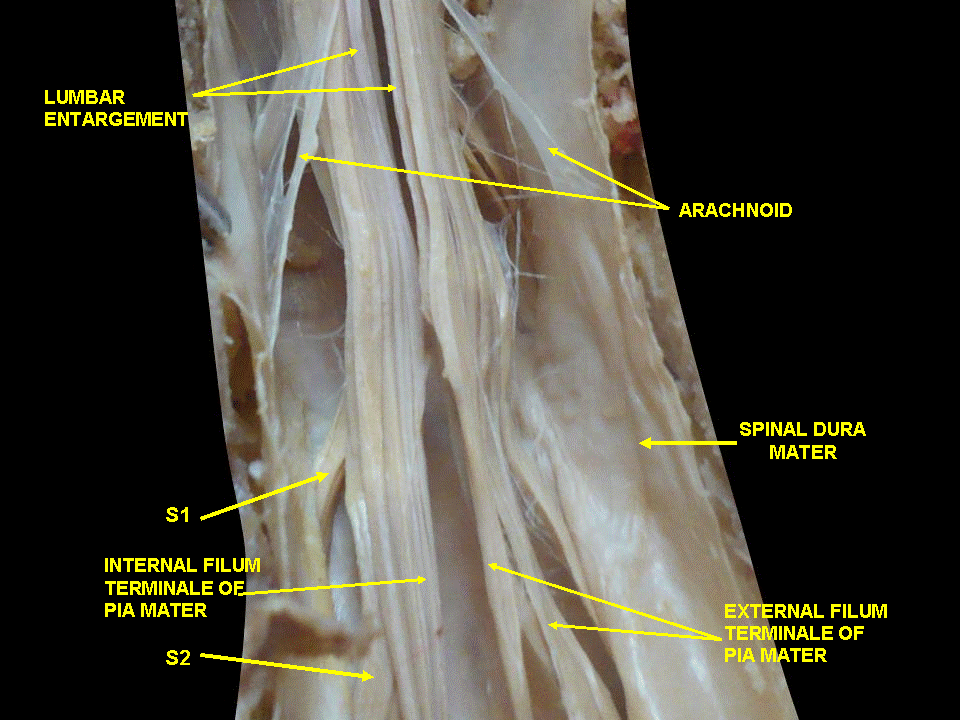
Spinal cord. Spinal membranes and nerve roots. Deep dissection. Posterior view.

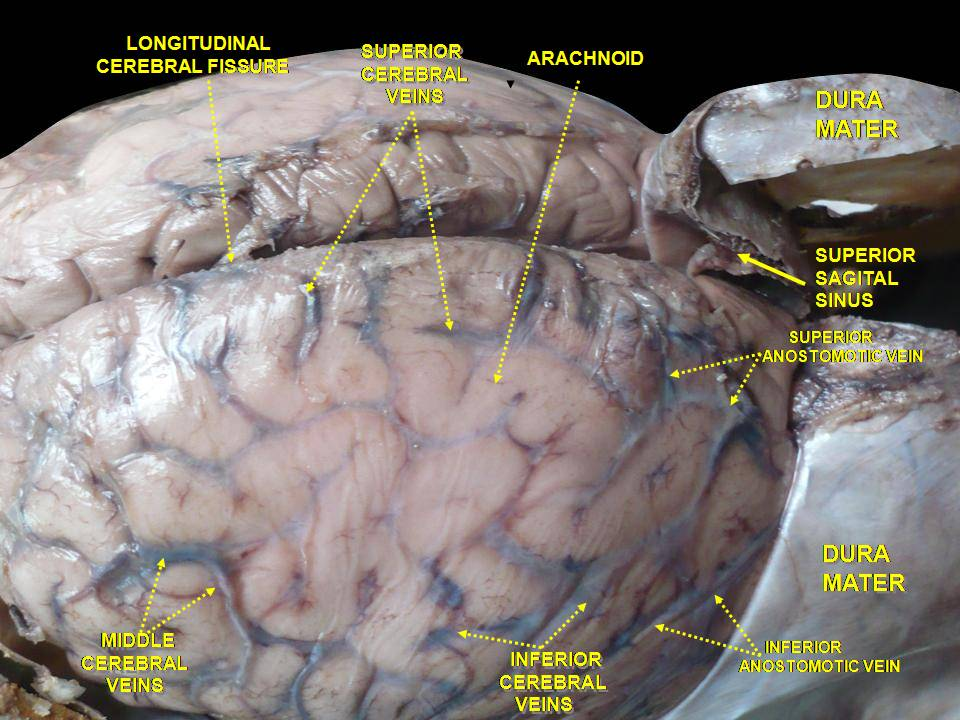
Meninges and superficial cerebral veins. Deep dissection. Superior view.

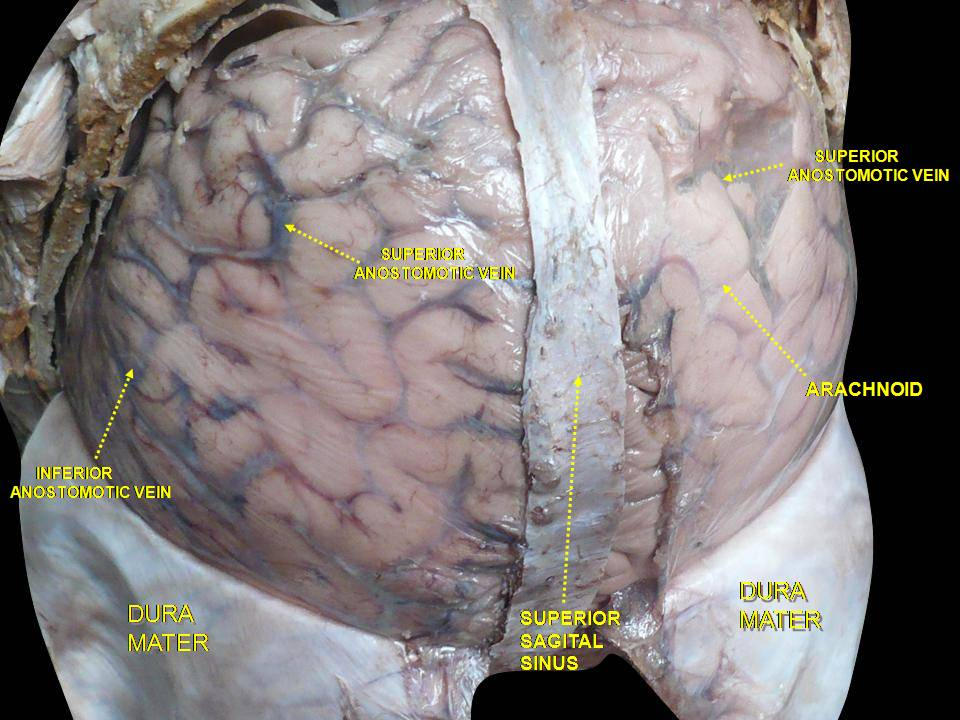
Meninges and superficial cerebral veins. Deep dissection. Superior view.

The arachnoid cells continue inside the brain, covering the so-called Virchow-Robin spaces or perivascular spaces. For that reason some meningiomas can appear as completely inside the brain.
