= Perivascular space =

Space surrounding blood vessels

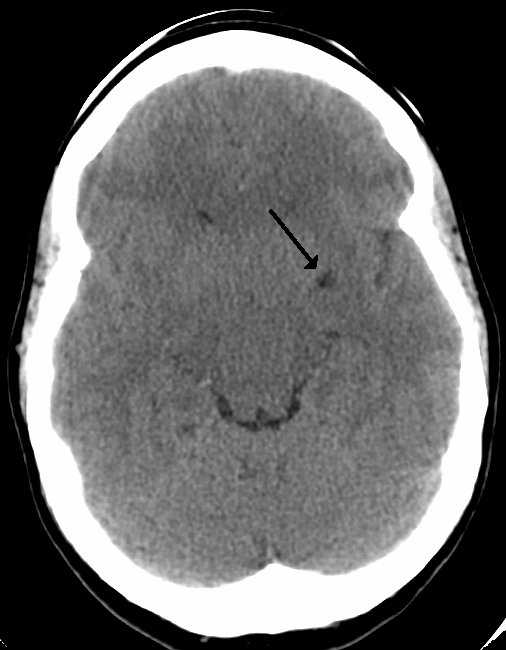
- A perivascular space as seen on CT

CT image showing extensive low attenuation in the right hemispheric white matter due to dilated Type 2 perivascular spaces

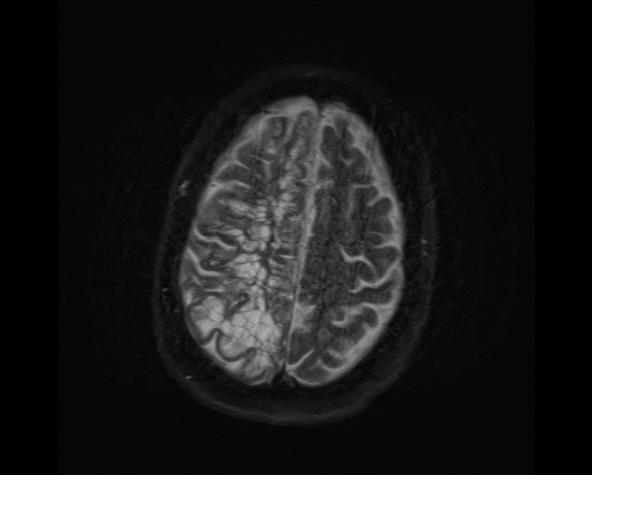
Axial fat-suppressed T2-weighted MRI image in the same patient as above demonstrating extensive dilated Type 2 perivascular spaces in the right hemisphere

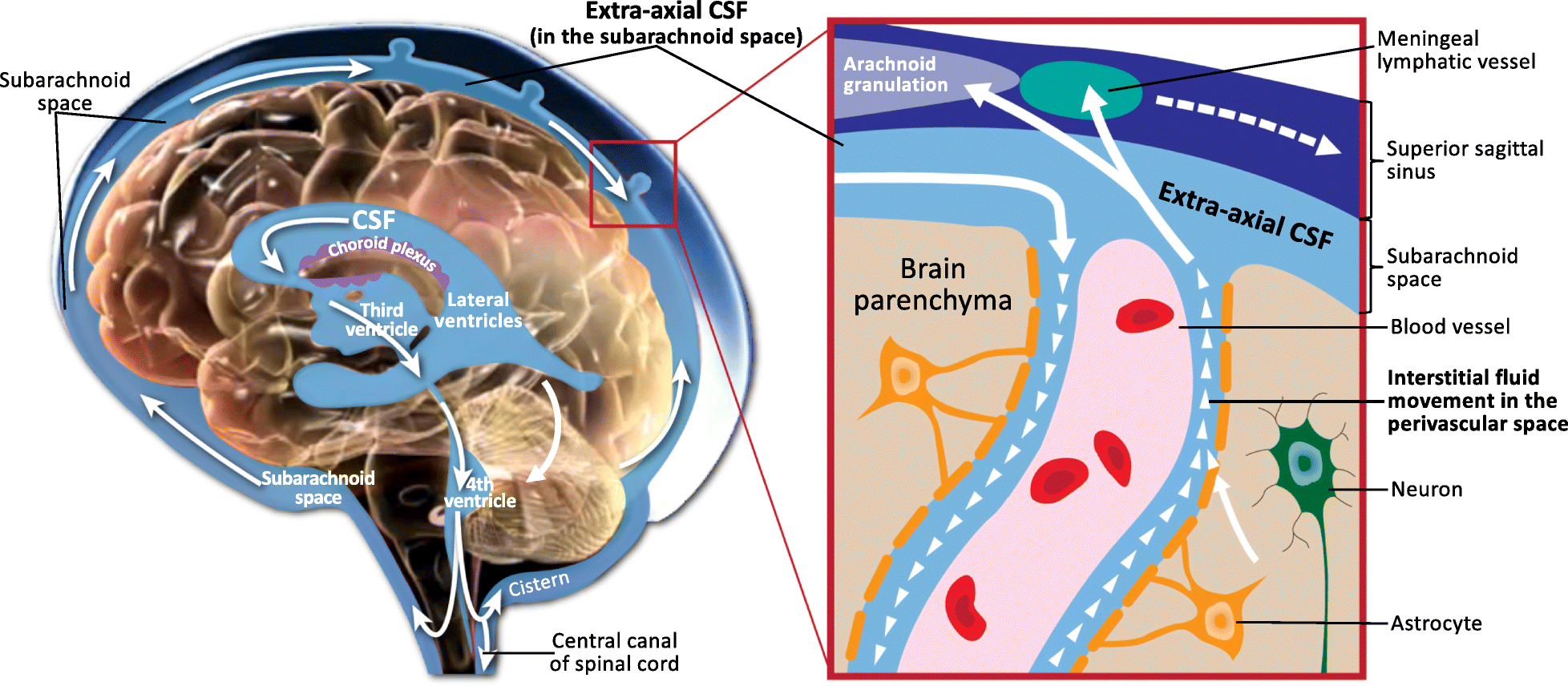
Perivascular space is depicted in the inset box.

A perivascular space, also known as a Virchow–Robin space, is a fluid-filled space surrounding certain blood vessels in several organs, including the brain, potentially having an immunological function, but more broadly a dispersive role for neural and blood-derived messengers. The brain pia mater is reflected from the surface of the brain onto the surface of blood vessels in the subarachnoid space. In the brain, perivascular cuffs are regions of leukocyte aggregation in the perivascular spaces, usually found in patients with viral encephalitis.

Perivascular spaces vary in dimension according to the type of blood vessel. In the brain where most capillaries have an imperceptible perivascular space, select structures of the brain, such as the circumventricular organs, are notable for having large perivascular spaces surrounding highly permeable capillaries, as observed by microscopy. The median eminence, a brain structure at the base of the hypothalamus, contains capillaries with wide perivascular spaces.

In humans, perivascular spaces surround arteries and veins can usually be seen as areas of dilatation on MRI images. While many normal brains will show a few dilated spaces, an increase in these spaces may correlate with the incidence of several neurodegenerative diseases, making the spaces a topic of research.

== Structure ==
Perivascular spaces are gaps containing interstitial fluid that span between blood vessels and their host organ, such as the brain, which they penetrate and serve as extravascular channels through which solutes can pass. Like the blood vessels around which they form, perivascular spaces are found in both the brain subarachnoid space and the subpial space.

Perivascular spaces surrounding arteries in the cerebral cortex and the basal ganglia are separated from the subpial space by one or two layers of leptomeninges, respectively, as well as the pia mater. By virtue of the leptomeningeal cell layer, the perivascular spaces belonging to the subarachnoid space are continuous with those of the subpial space. The direct communication between the perivascular spaces of the subarachnoid space and the subpial space is unique to the brain's arteries, as no leptomeningeal layers surround the brain's veins. Use of the scanning electron microscope has determined that the spaces surrounding blood vessels in the subarachnoid space are not continuous with the subarachnoid space because of the presence of pia mater cells joined by desmosomes.

Perivascular spaces, especially around fenestrated capillaries, are found in many organs, such as the thymus, liver, kidneys, spleen, bones, and pineal gland. Particularly within the brain circumventricular organs – subfornical organ, area postrema, and median eminence – large perivascular spaces are present around fenestrated capillaries, indicating that the spaces serve a dispersive role for brain- or bloodborne messengers.

Perivascular spaces may be enlarged to a diameter of five millimeters in healthy humans and do not imply disease. When enlarged, they can disrupt the function of the brain regions into which they project. Dilation can occur on one or both sides of the brain.

Dilated perivascular spaces are categorized into three types:

- Type 1 are located on the lenticulostriate arteries projecting into the basal ganglia
- Type 2 are located in the cortex following the path of the medullary arteries
- Type 3 are located in the midbrain

Perivascular spaces are most commonly located in the basal ganglia and white matter of the cerebrum, and along the optic tract. The ideal method used to visualize perivascular spaces is T2-weighted MRI. The MR images of other neurological disorders can be similar to those of the dilated spaces. These disorders are:

- cystic neoplasms
- lacunar infarctions
- cystic periventricular leukomalacia
- cryptococcosis
- multiple sclerosis
- mucopolysaccharidoses
- neurocysticercosis
- arachnoid cysts
- neuroepithelial cysts

Perivascular spaces are distinguished on an MRI by several key features. The spaces appear as distinct round or oval entities with a signal intensity visually equivalent to that of cerebrospinal fluid in the subarachnoid space. In addition, a perivascular space has no mass effect and is located along the blood vessel around which it forms.

== Function ==
One of the most basic roles of the perivascular space is the regulation of fluid movement in the central nervous system and its drainage. The spaces ultimately drain fluid from neuronal cell bodies to the cervical lymph nodes. In particular, the "tide hypothesis" suggests that the cardiac contraction creates and maintains pressure waves to modulate the flow to and from the subarachnoid space and the perivascular space. By acting as a sort of sponge, they are essential for signal transmission and the maintenance of extracellular fluid.

Another function is as an integral part of the blood–brain barrier (BBB). While the BBB is often described as the tight junctions between the endothelial cells, this is an oversimplification that neglects the intricate role that perivascular spaces take in separating the venous blood from the parenchyma of the brain. Often, cell debris and foreign particles, which are impermeable to the BBB will get through the endothelial cells, only to be phagocytosed in the perivascular spaces. This holds true for many T and B cells, as well as monocytes, giving this small fluid filled space an important immunological role.

Perivascular spaces also play an important role in immunoregulation; they not only contain interstitial and cerebrospinal fluid, but they also have a constant flux of macrophages, which is regulated by blood-borne mononuclear cells, but do not pass the basement membrane of the glia limitans. Similarly, as part of its role in signal transmission, perivascular spaces contain vasoactive neuropeptides (VNs), which, aside from regulating blood pressure and heart rate, have an integral role in controlling microglia. VNs serve to prevent inflammation by activating the enzyme adenylate cyclase which then produces cAMP. The production of cAMP aids in the modulation of auto-reactive T cells by regulatory T cells. The perivascular space is susceptible space for VN compromise and when their function is reduced in the space, immune response is adversely affected and the potential for degradation increases. When inflammation by T cells begins, astrocytes begin to undergo apoptosis, due to their CD95 receptor, to open up the glia limitans and let T cells into the parenchyma of the brain. Because this process is aided by the perivascular macrophages, these tend to accumulate during neuroinflammation and cause dilation of the spaces.

== Clinical significance ==
The clinical significance of perivascular spaces comes primarily from their tendency to dilate. The importance of dilation is hypothesized to be based on changes in shape rather than size. Enlarged spaces have been observed most commonly in the basal ganglia, specifically on the lenticulostriate arteries. They have also been observed along the paramedial mesencephalothalamic artery and the substantia nigra in the mesencephalon, the brain region below the insula, the dentate nucleus in the cerebellum, and the corpus callosum, as well as the brain region directly above it, the cingulate gyrus. Upon the clinical application of MRI, it was shown in several studies that perivascular space dilation and lacunar strokes are the most commonly observed histological correlates of signaling abnormalities.

=== Senescence ===
Dilation is most commonly and closely associated with aging. Dilation of perivascular spaces has been shown to correlate best with age, even when accompanying factors including hypertension, dementia, and white matter lesions are considered. In the elderly, such dilation has been correlated with many symptoms and conditions that often affect the arterial walls, including vascular hypertension, arteriosclerosis, reduced cognitive capacity, dementia, and low post-mortem brain weight. In addition to dilation among the elderly, dilation in young, healthy individuals can also be observed. This occurrence is rare and there has been no observed association in such cases with reduced cognitive function or white matter abnormalities. When dilated VRS are observed in the corpus callosum, there is generally no neurological deficit associated. They are often observed in this region as cystic lesions with cerebrospinal-like fluid.

=== Symptoms of dilation ===
In brain imaging for most cases, there is no disease associated with minor dilation of the perivascular spaces. Extreme dilation of perivascular spaces may be associated with clinical symptoms: when only one hemisphere is involved, symptoms may include a non-specific fainting attack, hypertension, positional vertigo, headache, early recall disturbances, and hemifacial tics, whereas people with severe bilateral dilation may experience ear pain, dementia, and seizures. Other general symptoms associated with VRS dilation may include memory impairment, visual changes, tremors, limb weakness, and ataxia.

=== Associated disorders ===
Dilation is a typical characteristic of several diseases and disorders. These include diseases from metabolic and genetic disorders such as mannosidosis, myotonic dystrophy, Lowe syndrome, and Coffin–Lowry syndrome. Dilation is also a common characteristic of diseases or disorders of vascular pathologies, including CADASIL (cerebral autosomal dominant arteriopathy with subcortical infarcts and leukoencephalopathy), hereditary infantile hemiparesis, retinal arteriolar tortuosity and leukoencephalopathy, migraines, and vascular dementia. A third group of disorders typically associated with VRS dilation is neuroectodermal syndromes. This includes polycystic brains associated with ectodermal dysplasia, frontonasal dysplasia, and Joubert syndrome. There is a fourth miscellaneous group of disorders typically associated with dilation that includes autism in children, megalencephalopathy, secondary Parkinson's disease, recent-onset multiple sclerosis, and chronic alcoholism. Because dilation can be associated with several diseases but also observed in healthy patients, it is always important in the evaluation of VRS to study the tissue around the dilation via MRI and to consider the entire clinical context.

== Current research ==
=== Causes of dilated VRS ===
Much of the current research concerning Virchow–Robin spaces relates to their known tendency to dilate. Research is presently being performed in order to determine the exact cause of dilation in these perivascular spaces. Current theories include mechanical trauma resulting from cerebrospinal fluid pulsation, elongation of ectactic penetrating blood vessels, and abnormal vascular permeability leading to increased fluid exudation. Further research has implicated shrinkage or atrophy of surrounding brain tissue, perivascular demyelination, coiling of the arteries as they age, altered permeability of the arterial wall and obstruction of lymphatic drainage pathways. In addition, insufficient fluid draining and injury to ischemic perivascular tissue resulting in an ex vacuo effect have been suggested as possible causes for dilated VRS.Dilated VRS might also be linked to vascular damage, blood leakage and microaneurysm formation.

=== Association of dilated VRS and other diseases ===
Recent and ongoing research has found associations between enlarged VRS and several disorders.

==== Dementia ====
Dilated Virchow–Robin spaces were once commonly noted in autopsies of persons with dementia, giving suspicion they may be a factor in the disease, although this association has not been confirmed.

==== Alzheimer's disease ====
Some studies have assessed the spatial distribution and prevalence of VRS in people with Alzheimer's disease versus those without the disease. Researchers have found that while VRS appear to be correlated with natural aging, MR imaging reveals a greater prevalence of VRS in those with Alzheimer's.

Cerebral amyloid angiopathy (CAA), a blood vessel failure often associated with Alzheimer's disease, utilizes dilated VRS to spread inflammation to the parenchyma. Because the VRS often have an extra membrane in gray matter, the ischemic CAA response is often observed in white matter.

It has been hypothesized that the structure of VRS in the cerebral cortex may contribute to the development of Alzheimer's disease. In contrast to VRS of the basal ganglia, VRS in the cerebral cortex are surrounded by only one layer of leptomeninges. As such, VRS in the cerebral cortex may drain β-amyloid in interstitial fluid less effectively than VRS in the basal ganglia. The less-effective drainage may lead to the development of the β-amyloid plaques that characterize Alzheimer's disease. In support of this hypothesis, studies have noted the greater frequency of β-amyloid plaques in the cerebral cortex than in the basal ganglia of Alzheimer's disease patients.

==== Stroke ====
Because dilated perivascular spaces are so closely correlated with cerebrovascular disease, there is much current research on their use as a diagnostic tool. In a recent study of 31 subjects, abnormal dilation, along with irregular CSF pulsation, were correlated with those subjects having three or more risk factors for strokes. Therefore, perivascular spaces are a possible novel biomarker for hemorrhagic strokes.

CADASIL syndrome (cerebral autosomal dominant arteriopathy with subcortical infarcts and leukoencephalopathy syndrome) is a hereditary stroke condition due to a Notch 3 gene mutation on Chromosome 19. Studies have noted that in comparison to family members lacking the affected haplotype that leads to the condition, an increased number of dilated spaces is observed in individuals with CADASIL. These perivascular spaces are localized primarily in the putamen and temporal subcortical white matter and they appear to correlate with age of the individual with the condition rather than severity of the disease itself.

There has been a high risk of stroke associated with dilated perivascular spaces in the elderly according to the Framingham Stroke Risk Score. In contrast, other studies have concluded that the dilation of these spaces is a normal phenomenon in aging with no association with arterosclerosis. This remains, therefore, an important point of research in the field.

==== Multiple sclerosis ====
Similar to the research concerning a potential connection between perivascular spaces and Alzheimer's, MRI scans of people recently diagnosed with multiple sclerosis (MS) have been studied. Larger, more prevalent spaces have been observed in those with MS. Additional studies with similar findings have suggested that the inflammatory cells which contribute to the demyelination that characterizes MS also attack the perivascular spaces. Studies using advanced MRI techniques will be necessary to determine if the perivascular spaces can be implicated as a potential marker of the disease.

==== Autism ====
Dilated perivascular spaces are common among the elderly and uncommon in children. Studies have noted the association between both developmental delay and non-syndromic autism and enlarged or dilated perivascular spaces. Non-syndromic autism categorizes autistic patients for which there is no known cause.

== History ==
The appearance of perivascular spaces was first noted in 1843 by Durant-Fardel. In 1851, Rudolf Virchow was the first to provide a detailed description of these microscopic spaces between the outer and inner/middle lamina of the brain vessels. Charles-Philippe Robin confirmed these findings in 1859 and was the first to describe the perivascular spaces as channels that existed in normal anatomy. The spaces were called Virchow-Robin spaces and are still also known as such. The immunological significance was discovered by Wilhelm His, Sr. in 1865 based on his observations of the flow of interstitial fluid over the spaces to the lymphatic system.

For many years after Virchow-Robin spaces were first described, it was thought that they were in free communication with the cerebrospinal fluid in the subarachnoid space. It was later shown with the use of electron microscopy that the pia mater serves as separation between the two. Upon the application of MRI, measurements of the differences of signal intensity between the perivascular spaces and cerebrospinal fluid supported these findings. As research technologies continued to expand, so too did information regarding their function, anatomy and clinical significance.
