= Anterior median fissure of spinal cord =

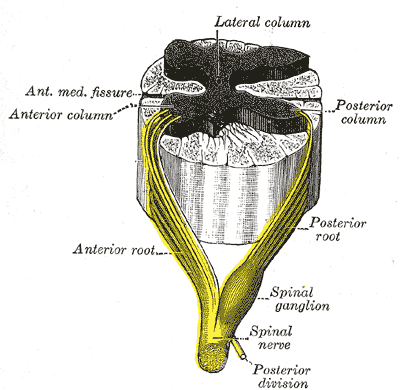
- A spinal nerve with its anterior and posterior roots.

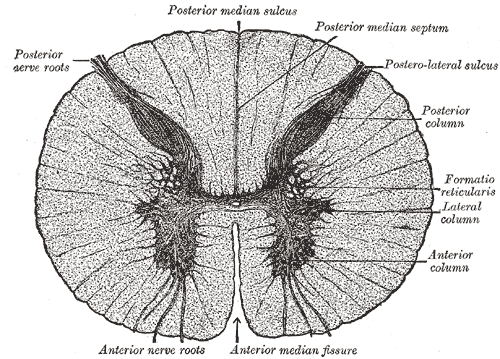
- Transverse section of the spinal cord in the mid-thoracic region.

Details

Identifiers
- Latin: fissura mediana anterior medullae spinalis
- TA98: A14.1.02.007
- TA2: 6053
- FMA: 83735

The anterior median fissure of the spinal cord is a deep midline groove of the anterior spinal cord. It divides the white matter of the anterior spinal cord nearly in two. The spinal pia mater extends into the fissure to line the surfaces of the spinal cord.

== Anatomy ==
It has an average depth of about 3 mm, but this is increased in the lower part of the spinal cord. It contains a double fold of pia mater. Its floor is formed by a transverse band of white matter - the anterior white commissure - which is perforated by blood vessels on their way to or from the central part of the spinal cord.

=== Relations ===
The anterior median fissure provides a groove in which the anterior spinal artery sits.

== Clinical significance ==
=== Imaging ===
The anterior median fissure may be identified on computerized tomography (CT) myelograms, but more commonly on magnetic resonance imaging (MRI) scans. The AMF has a characteristic appearance on MRI scans that differs from the MRI appearance of the central canal.

== Additional images ==
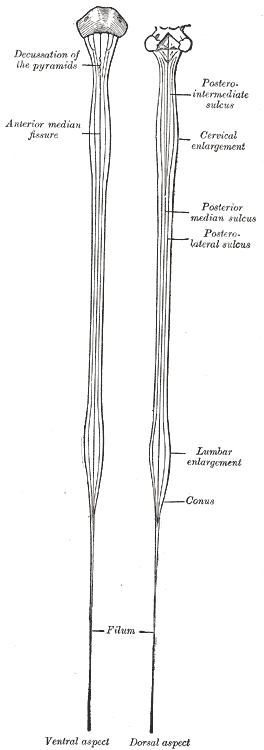
Diagrams of the medulla spinalis.
