= Intumescentia =

Intumescentia is Latin for an enlargement (intumescence) in the vertebral column, and may refer to:

- Lumbar enlargement
- Cervical enlargement
