= Rhogostomidae =

Scientific classification
- Domain: Eukaryota
- Clade: Sar
- Clade: Rhizaria
- Phylum: Cercozoa
- Class: Thecofilosea
- Order: Cryomonadida
- Family: Rhogostomidae; Dumack, Öztoprak, Rüger & Bonkowski, 2017

Genera
- Capsellina; Sacciforma; Rhogostoma

Family of thecate amoebae

Rhogostomidae is a family of thecate amoebae with a ventral cleft-like aperture. Their theca is thin and flexible and adheres to the cell. The cleft-like aperture allows them to extend and retract their filose pseudopodia, which they use to move and feed. They are primarily feeding on bacteria, but they are also known to consume yeasts and algae. The family contains three genera: Capsellina, Sacciforma, and Rhogostoma.
