= Cauda equina =

Anatomical structure

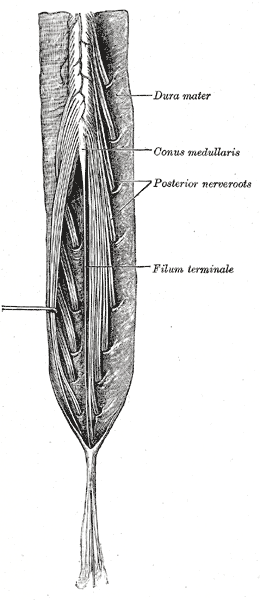
- Cauda equina and filum terminale seen from behind.

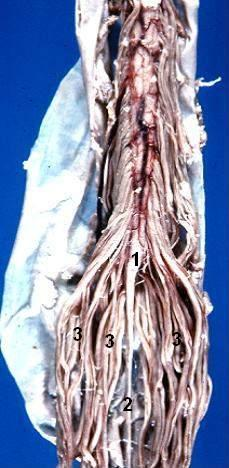
- Human caudal spinal cord anterior view

Details
- Artery: Iliolumbar artery

Identifiers
- Latin: cauda equina
- MeSH: D002420
- TA98: A14.2.00.036
- TA2: 6163
- FMA: 52590

The cauda equina (from Latin tail of horse) is a bundle of spinal nerves and spinal nerve rootlets, consisting of the second through fifth lumbar nerve pairs, the first through fifth sacral nerve pairs, and the coccygeal nerve, all of which arise from the lumbar enlargement and the conus medullaris of the spinal cord. The cauda equina occupies the lumbar cistern, a subarachnoid space inferior to the conus medullaris. The nerves that compose the cauda equina innervate the pelvic organs and lower limbs to include motor innervation of the hips, knees, ankles, feet, internal anal sphincter and external anal sphincter. In addition, the cauda equina extends to sensory innervation of the perineum and, partially, parasympathetic innervation of the bladder.

== Structure ==
In adulthood, the cauda equina is made of lumbosacral spinal nerve roots.

=== Development ===
In humans, the spinal cord stops growing in infancy. At birth the end of the spinal cord is about the level of the third lumbar vertebra, or L3. Because the bones of the vertebral column continue to grow, by about 12 months of age the end of the cord reaches its permanent position. Typically this is at the level of L1 or L2 (closer to the head), ranging due to normal anatomical variations anywhere from the twelfth thoracic vertebra (T12) to L3. Individual spinal nerve roots arise from the cord as they get closer to the head, but as the differential growth occurs, the top end of the nerve stays attached to the spinal cord while the lower end of the nerve exits the spinal column at its proper level. This results in a "bundle"-like structure of nerve fibers that extends caudally, within the spinal column, from the end of the spinal cord, gradually declining in number further down as individual pairs leave the spinal column.

== Clinical significance ==
=== Needle insertion ===
The cauda equina exists within the lumbar cistern, a gap between the arachnoid membrane and the pia mater of the spinal cord, called the subarachnoid space. Cerebrospinal fluid also exists within this space. Because the spinal cord terminates at level L1/L2, lumbar puncture (or colloquially, "spinal tap") is performed from the lumbar cistern between two vertebrae at level L3/L4, or L4/L5, where there is no risk of accidental injury to the spinal cord, when a sample of CSF is needed for clinical purposes.

=== Cauda equina syndrome ===
Cauda equina syndrome, a rare disorder affecting the bundle of nerve roots (cauda equina) at the lower (lumbar) end of the spinal cord, is a surgical emergency. Cauda equina syndrome occurs when the nerve roots in the lumbar spine are compressed, disrupting sensation and movement. Nerve roots that control the function of the bladder and bowel are especially vulnerable to damage. It can lead to permanent paralysis, impaired bladder and/or bowel control, loss of sexual sensation, and other problems if left untreated. Even with immediate treatment, some patients may not recover complete function.

Cauda equina syndrome most commonly results from a massive disc herniation in the lumbar region. A disc herniation occurs when one of the soft flexible discs that functions as an elastic shock absorber between the bones of the spinal column displaces from its normal position. The herniation occurs after the disc begins to break down with aging and can be precipitated by stress or a mechanical problem in the spine. The result is that the softer, center portion of the disc pushes out and causes pressure on the nerve roots in the lumbar spine. Other causes include spinal lesions and tumors, spinal infections or inflammation, lumbar spinal stenosis, trauma to the lower back, birth abnormalities, spinal arteriovenous malformations (AVMs), spinal hemorrhages (subarachnoid, subdural, epidural), narrowing of the spinal canal, postoperative lumbar spine surgery complications or spinal anesthesia. Cauda equina syndrome can often be mistaken for conditions such as spinal stenosis, herniated discs and nerve root compression.

=== Radiculopathy ===
The cauda equina is vulnerable to being compressed, causing a radiculopathy.

== History ==
The cauda equina was named after its resemblance to a horse's tail (Latin: cauda equina) by the French anatomist Andreas Lazarus (André du Laurens) in the 17th century.

== See also ==
- Spinal cord
- Cauda equina syndrome
- Conus medullaris
