= Denticulate =

Denticulate is an adjective referring to something having teeth-like structures. It may refer to:

- Denticulate tool, a type of stone tool in archeology
- Denticulate leaf, a leaf with finely toothed margins
- Denticulate ligaments, in human anatomy
- a type of conodont prehistoric fish, characterized by the sideward orientation of the major teeth-like projections (denticulate processes)

== See also ==
- Dentate (disambiguation)
