= Myelomere =

A myelomere is the segment of spinal cord to which a given pair of dorsal and ventral roots is attached.

Because the adult spinal cord does not extend down as far as the vertebral column does, the lower myelomeres are not opposite their correspondingly numbered vertebrae. Thus myelomere S1 is opposite the T12 vertebra.
