= Dentate =

Dentate may refer to:

- A species having dentition
- An energy-dissipating baffle block in a spillway
- An individual not being edentulous
- Dentate gyrus of the hippocampus
- Dentate nucleus of the cerebellum
- Denticity in chemistry
- Dentate leaf, a kind of leaf margin
- Dentate wing, a wing shape on Lepidoptera species

== See also ==
- Denticulate (disambiguation)
