= Filum terminale =

Fibrous tissue supporting the spinal cord

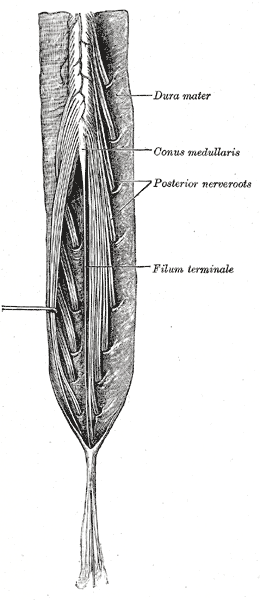
- Cauda equina and filum terminale seen from behind. The dura mater has been opened and spread out, and the arachnoid has been removed. (Filum terminale (internum) labeled at center right.)

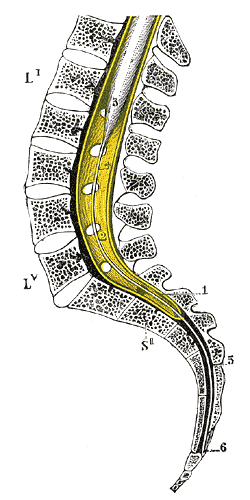
- Sagittal section of vertebral canal to show the lower end of the medulla spinalis and the filum terminale. Li, Lv. First and fifth lumbar vertebra. SII Second sacral vertebra.: 1. Dura mater.; 2. Lower part of subarachnoid cavity.; 3. Lower extremity of medulla spinalis.; 4. Filum terminale internum.; 5. Filum terminale externum.; 6. Attachment of filum terminale to first segment of coccyx.

Identifiers
- TA98: A14.1.01.401
- TA2: 5384, 5414
- FMA: 83977

The filum terminale ('terminal thread') is a delicate strand of fibrous tissue, about 20 cm in length, extending inferiorly from the apex of the conus medullaris to attach onto the coccyx. The filum terminale acts to anchor the spinal cord and spinal meninges inferiorly.

The upper portion of the filum terminale is formed by spinal pia mater within a dilated dural sac, while the lower portion is formed by both pia and dura mater (with the outer dural layer closely adhering to the inner pial component).

== Anatomy ==
The proximal/superior part – the filum terminale internum or pial part of terminal filum – measures 15 cm in length and extends as far as the inferior border of the second sacral vertebra (S2) (the inferior limit sacral canal). It is composed of the vestiges of neural tissue, connective tissue, and neuroglial tissue lined by pia mater. It is contained within a tubular sheath of the dura mater and is surrounded by the nerves of the cauda equina (from which it can be easily recognized by its blueish-white color).

The inferior/distal part – the filum terminale externum, dural part of terminal filum, or coccygeal ligament – is formed as the filum terminale internum reaches the inferior extremity of the dural sac; henceforth, the filum terminale becomes invested by a layer of dura mater.

The filum terminale ultimately terminates inferiorly by attaching to the dorsum of the coccyx at the first coccygeal segment, flaring out to blend with the coccygeal periosteum.

=== Relations ===
The filum terminale is situated centrally amid the spinal nerve roots of the cauda equina (but is not itself a part of the cauda equina).

The inferior-most spinal nerve, the coccygeal nerve, leaves the spinal cord at the level of the conus medullaris via respective vertebrae through their intervertebral foramina, superior to the filum terminale. However, adhering to the outer surface of the filum terminale are a few strands of nerve fibres which probably represent rudimentary second and third coccygeal nerves.

The central canal of the spinal cord extends inferiorly into the superior part of the filum terminale.

=== Development ===
The filum terminale is the vestigial remnant of the caudal portion of the spinal cord which forms a tail-like caudal eminence in the embryo.

== Additional images ==
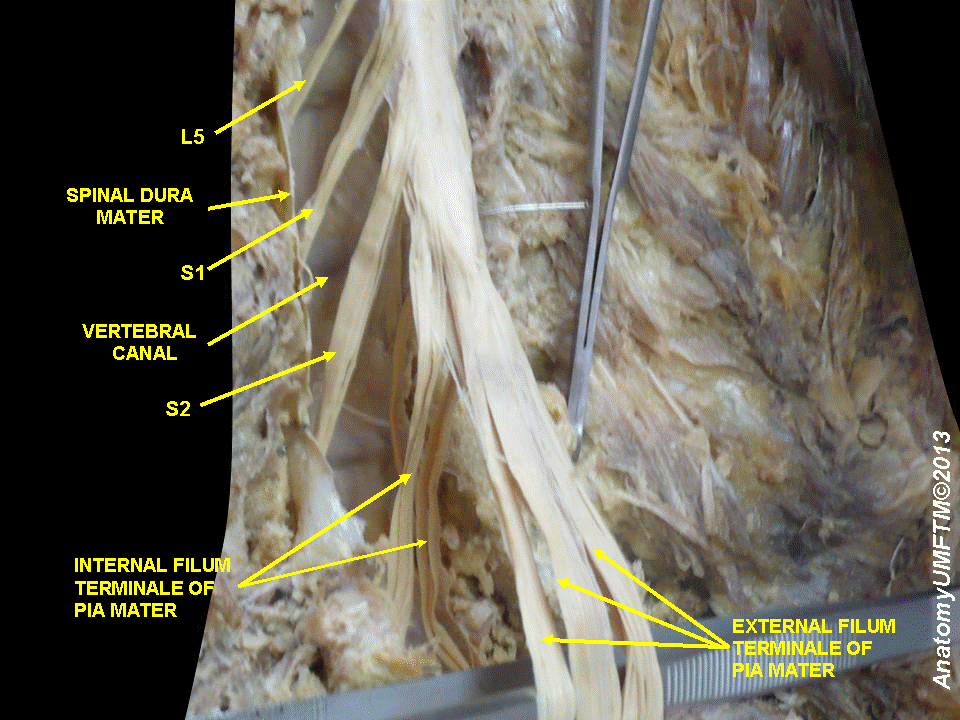
Spinal cord. Spinal membranes and nerve roots. Deep dissection. Posterior view.

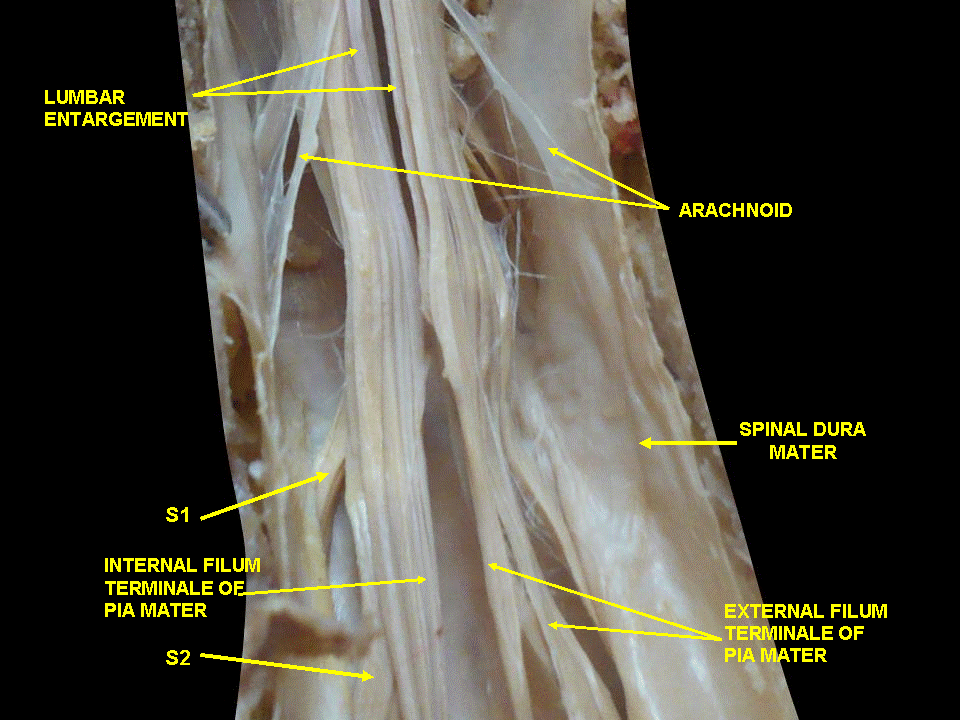
Spinal cord. Spinal membranes and nerve roots. Deep dissection. Posterior view.

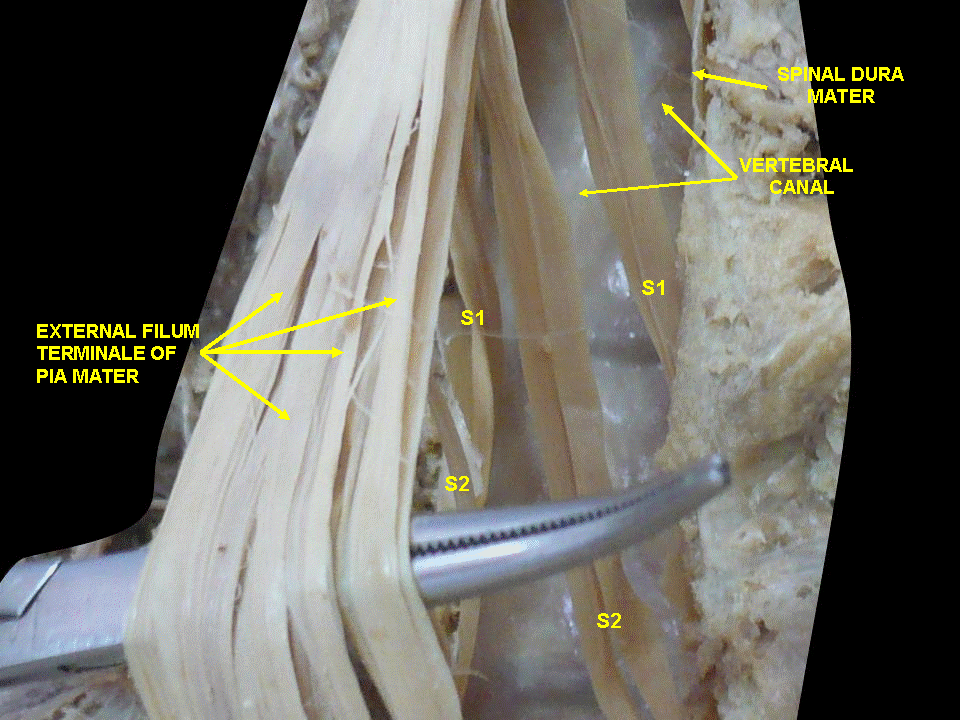
Spinal cord. Spinal membranes and nerve roots. Deep dissection. Posterior view.

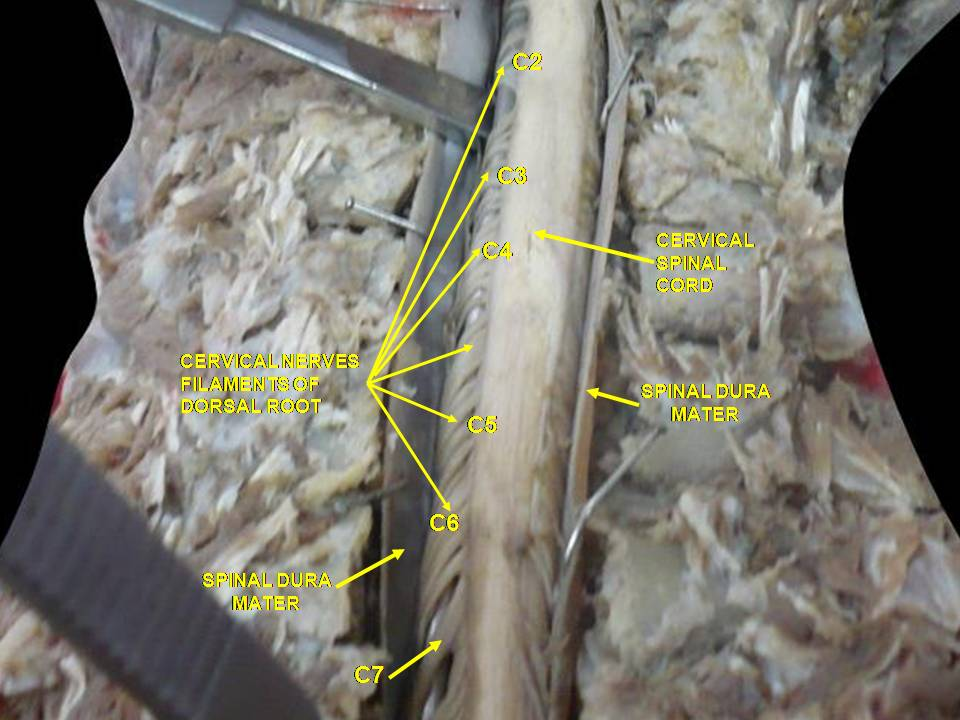
Spinal cord. Spinal membranes and nerve roots. Deep dissection. Posterior view.

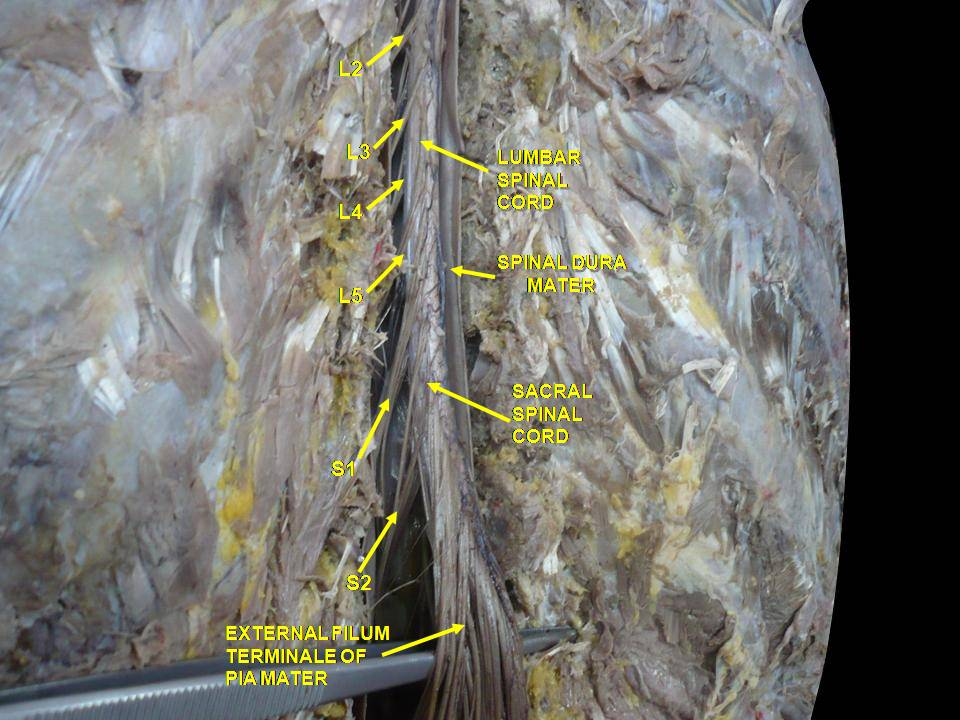
Spinal cord. Spinal membranes and nerve roots. Deep dissection. Posterior view.

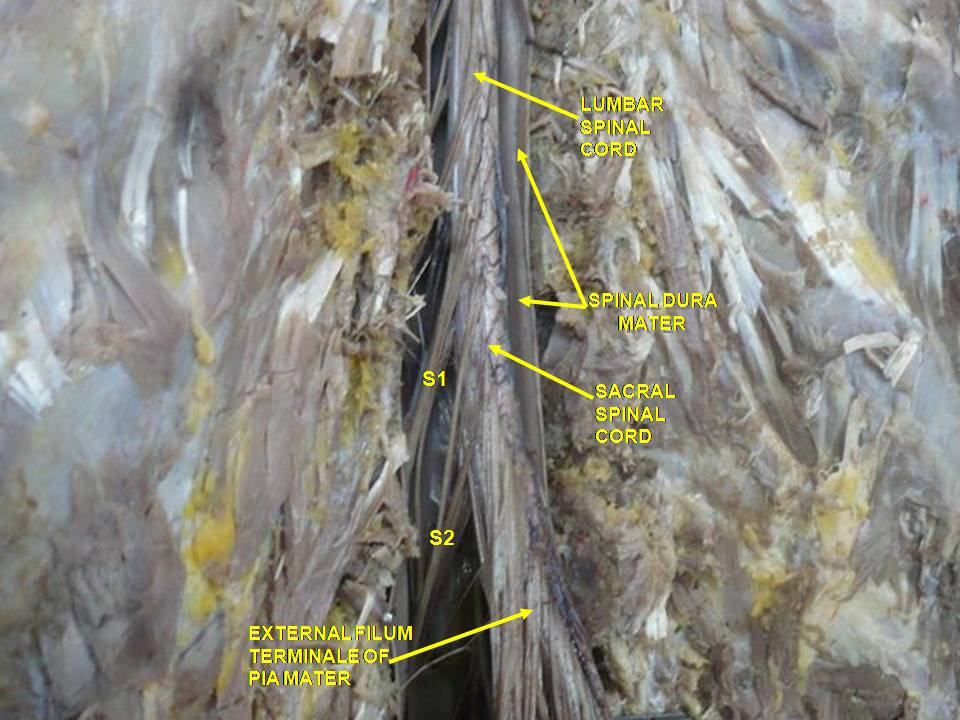
Spinal cord. Spinal membranes and nerve roots. Deep dissection. Posterior view.

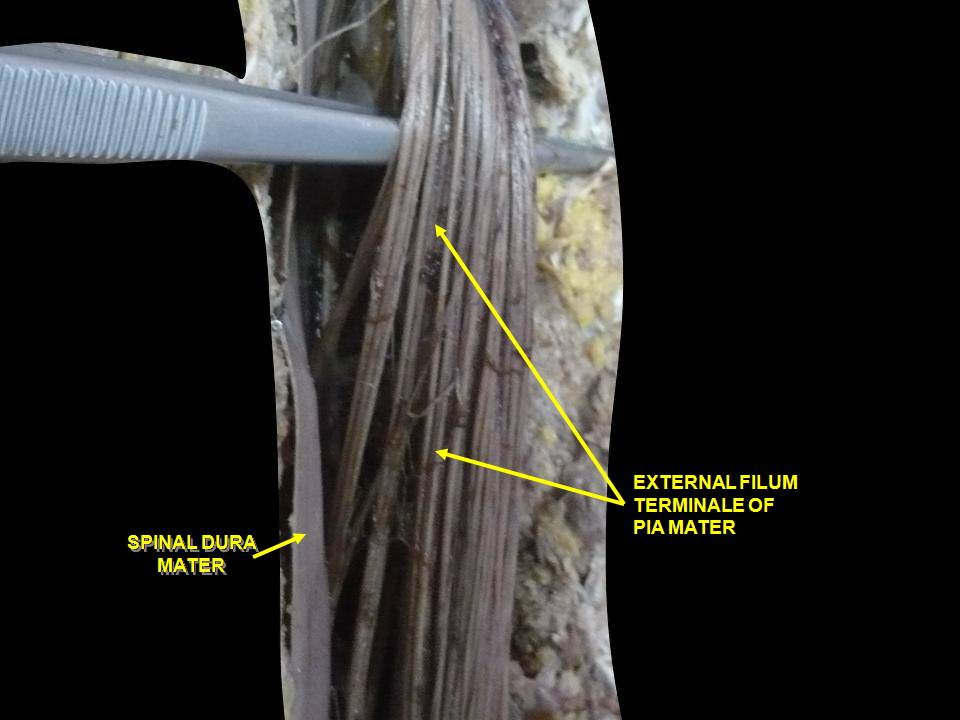
Spinal cord. Spinal membranes and nerve roots. Deep dissection. Posterior view.
