= Theca =

Sheath or covering

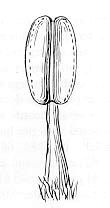
Strawberry anther with parallel thecae

In biology, a theca (pl.: thecae) is a sheath or a covering.

== Botany ==
In botany, the theca is related to plant's flower anatomy. The theca of an angiosperm consists of a pair of microsporangia that are adjacent to each other and share a common area of dehiscence called the stomium. Any part of a microsporophyll that bears microsporangia is called an anther. Most anthers are formed on the apex of a filament. An anther and its filament together form a typical (or filantherous) stamen, part of the male floral organ.

The typical anther is bilocular, i.e. it consists of two thecae. Each theca contains two microsporangia, also known as pollen sacs. The microsporangia produce the microspores, which for seed plants are known as pollen grains.

If the pollen sacs are not adjacent, or if they open separately, then no thecae are formed. In Lauraceae, for example, the pollen sacs are spaced apart and open independently.

The tissue between the locules and the cells is called the connective and the parenchyma. Both pollen sacs are separated by the stomium. When the anther is dehiscing, it opens at the stomium.

The outer cells of the theca form the epidermis. Below the epidermis, the somatic cells form the tapetum. These support the development of microspores into mature pollen grains. However, little is known about the underlying genetic mechanisms, which play a role in male sporo- and gametogenesis.

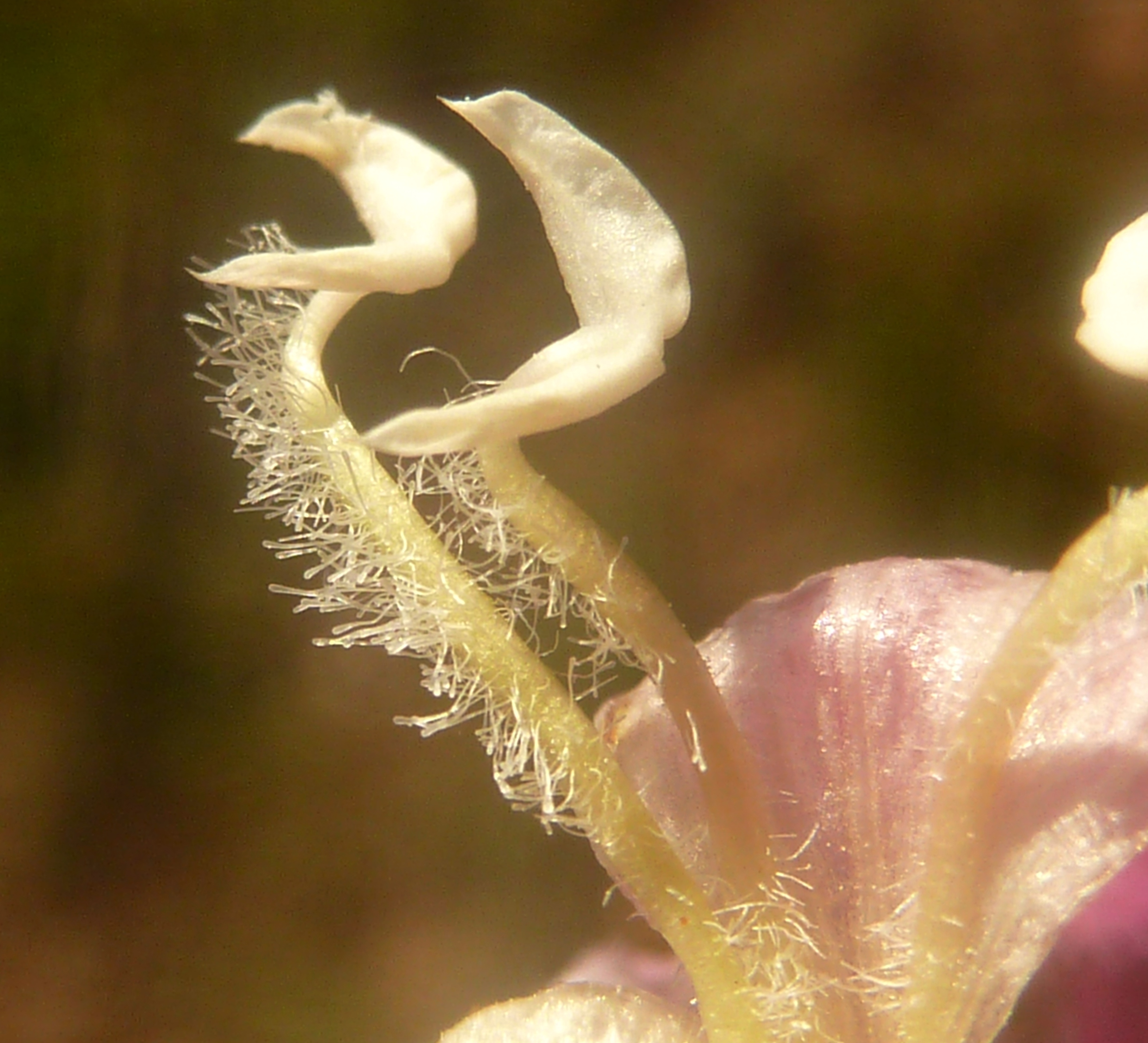
Divergent thecae in Graderia

The thecal arrangement of a typical stamen can be as follows:

- Divergent: both thecae in line, and forming an acute angle with the filament
- Transverse (or explanate): both thecae exactly in line, at right angles with the filament
- Oblique: the thecae fixed to each other in an oblique way
- Parallel: the thecae fixed to each other in a parallel way

== Zoology ==
In biology, the theca of follicle can also refer to the site of androgen production in females. The theca of the spinal cord is called the thecal sac, and intrathecal injections are made there or in the subarachnoid space of the skull.

In human embryogenesis, the theca cells form a corpus luteum after a Graafian follicle has expelled its secondary oocyte arrested in second meiosis.

Thecal shape is also important in graptolite and pterobranch taxonomy, as well as in many echinoderm groups.

In dinoflagellates that are armoured their covering is made up of thecal plates.

== In other taxonomic groups ==
In microbiology and planktology, a theca is a subcellular structural component out of which the frustules of diatoms and dinoflagellates are constructed.

== See also ==
- Intrathecal
- Thecal sac
