= Cervical enlargement =

Widened area of spinal cord attaching to upper limb nerves

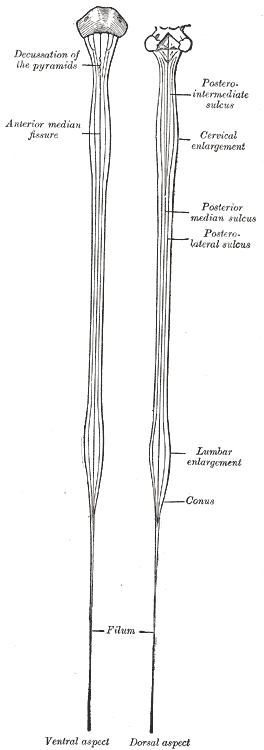
- Diagrams of the medulla spinalis. (Cervical enlargement labeled at upper right.)

Details

Identifiers
- Latin: intumescentia cervicalis
- TA98: A14.1.02.002
- TA2: 6050
- FMA: 74893

The cervical enlargement corresponds with the attachments of the large nerves which supply the upper limbs.

Located just above the brachial plexus, it extends from about the fifth cervical to the first thoracic vertebra, its maximum circumference (about 38 mm.) being on a level with the attachment of the sixth pair of cervical nerves.

The reason behind the enlargement of the cervical region is because of the increased neural input and output to the upper limbs.

An analogous region in the lower limbs occurs at the lumbar enlargement.
