= Lumbar enlargement =

Widened area of spinal cord attaching to lower limb nerves

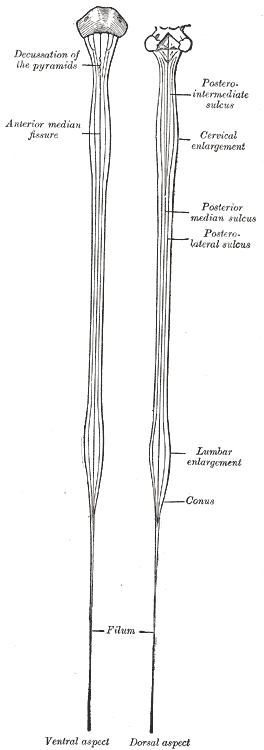
- Diagrams of the medulla spinalis. (Cervical enlargement labeled at center right.)

Details

Identifiers
- Latin: intumescentia lumbosacralis
- TA98: A14.1.02.003
- TA2: 6051
- FMA: 74895

The lumbar enlargement (or lumbosacral enlargement) is a widened area of the spinal cord that gives attachment to the nerves which supply the lower limbs.

It commences about the level of T11 and ends at L2, and reaches its maximum circumference, of about 33 mm. Inferior to the lumbar enlargement is the conus medullaris.

An analogous region for the upper limbs exists at the cervical enlargement.

== Additional images ==
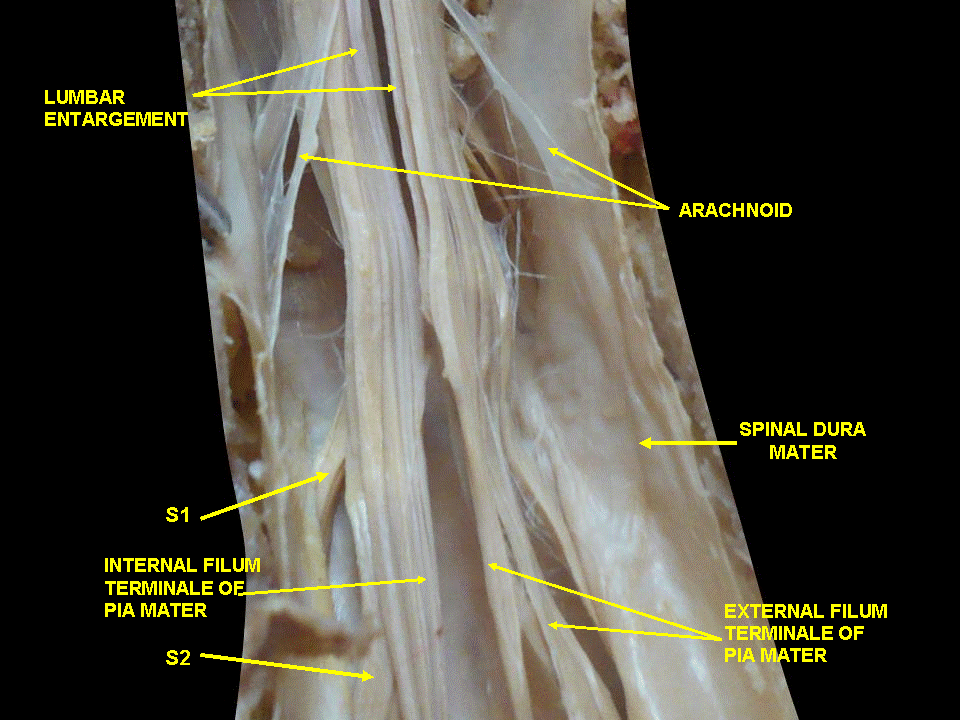
Spinal cord. Spinal membranes and nerve roots. Deep dissection. Posterior view.
