= Conus medullaris =

Lower part of the spinal cord

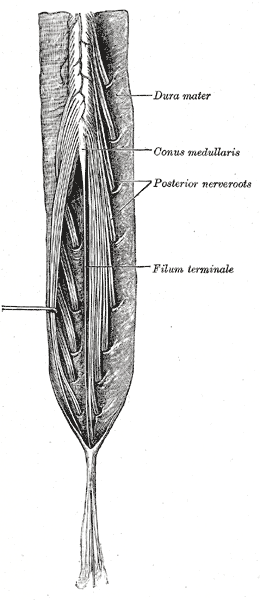
- Cauda equina and filum terminale seen from behind. The dura mater has been opened and spread out, and the arachnoid mater has been removed.

Identifiers
- TA98: A14.1.02.004
- TA2: 6052
- FMA: 74897

The conus medullaris (Latin for "medullary cone") or conus terminalis is the tapered, lower end of the spinal cord. It occurs near lumbar vertebral levels 1 (L1) and 2 (L2), occasionally lower. The upper end of the conus medullaris is usually not well defined, however, its corresponding spinal cord segments are usually S1–S5.

After the spinal cord tapers out, the spinal nerves continue to branch out diagonally, forming the cauda equina.

The pia mater that surrounds the spinal cord, however, projects directly downward, forming a slender filament called the filum terminale, which connects the conus medullaris to the back of the coccyx. The filum terminale provides a connection between the conus medullaris and the coccyx which stabilizes the entire spinal cord.

== Blood supply ==
The blood supply consists of three spinal arterial vessels—the anterior median longitudinal arterial trunk and the right and left posterior spinal arteries. Other less prominent sources of blood supply include radicular arterial branches from the aorta, lateral sacral arteries, and the fifth lumbar, iliolumbar, and middle sacral arteries. The latter contribute more to the vascular supply of the cauda equina.

== Pathology ==
Conus medullaris syndrome is a collection of signs and symptoms associated with injury to the conus medullaris. It typically causes back pain and bowel and bladder dysfunction, spastic or flaccid weakness depending on the level of the lesion, and bilateral sensory loss. Comparatively, cauda equina syndrome may cause radicular pain, bowel/bladder dysfunction, patchy sensory loss or saddle anesthesia and lower extremity weakness at the level of the lumbar and sacral roots.

Pediatric patients may have a syrinx associated with their Chiari malformation and the conus medullaris will be located at or below the L2–L3 lumbar vertebrae disk space.

Isolated infarcts of the conus medullaris are rare, but should be considered in patients with acute cauda equina syndrome, especially in females. According to a 2021 paper by You-Jiang Tan, et al., those with demonstrated causes or with vascular risk factors are less likely to walk without assistance.
