= Spinal nerve root =

Spinal nerve root may refer to:

- Posterior root of spinal nerve
- Anterior root of spinal nerve
