= Tetraplegia =

Paralysis of all four limbs and torso

- Other names: Quadriplegia
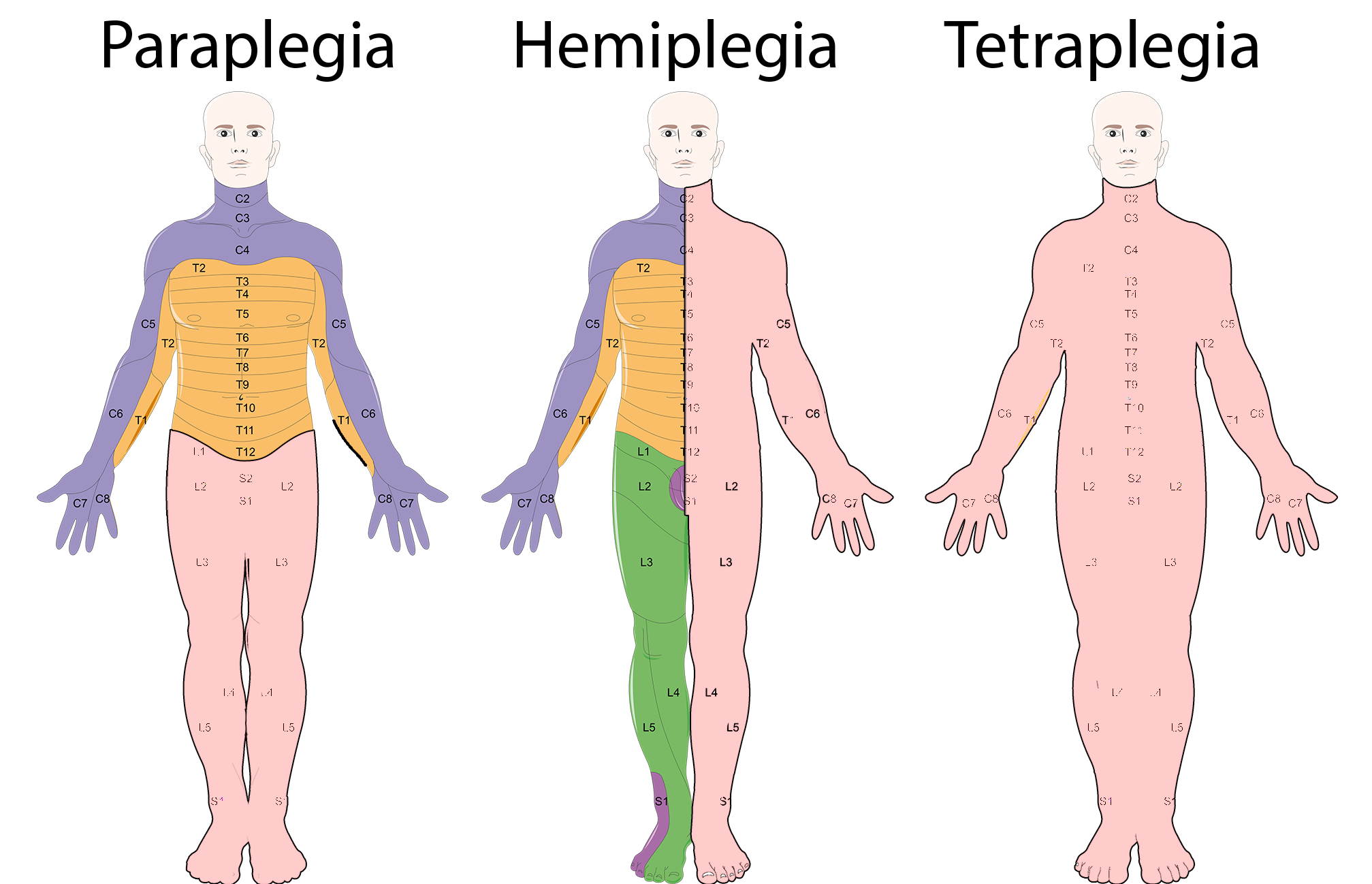
- Affected areas (pink) representing differences between paraplegia (left), hemiplegia (middle), and tetraplegia (right). Areas may differ for each condition and are dependent upon level of injury.
- Specialty: Neurosurgery, physical medicine and rehabilitation
- Types: Complete, incomplete
- Causes: Damage to spinal cord, peripheral nerves, or brain by illness or injury; congenital conditions
- Diagnostic method: Based on symptoms, medical imaging

Tetraplegia, also known as quadriplegia, is defined as the dysfunction or loss of motor or sensory function in all four limbs, typically caused by damage to the cervical area of the spinal cord. A loss of motor function can present as either weakness or paralysis leading to partial or total loss of function in the arms, legs, trunk, and pelvis (paraplegia is similar but affects the thoracic, lumbar, and sacral segments of the spinal cord, and arm function is retained). The paralysis may be flaccid or spastic. A loss of sensory function can present as an impairment or complete inability to sense light touch, pressure, heat, pinprick/pain, and proprioception. In these types of spinal cord or peripheral nerve injury, it is common to have a loss of both sensation and motor control.

== Signs and symptoms ==
Although the most obvious symptom is impairment of the limbs, functioning is also impaired in the trunk and pelvic organs. This can lead to loss or impairment of controlling bowel and bladder, sexual function, digestion, breathing, and other autonomic functions. Sensation is usually impaired in affected areas, which may manifest as numbness, reduced sensation, or neuropathic pain. Tetraplegics are often more vulnerable to pressure sores, osteoporosis and fractures, frozen joints, spasticity, respiratory complications, infections, autonomic dysreflexia, deep vein thrombosis, and cardiovascular disease.

The severity of the condition depends on both the level at which the spinal cord is injured and the extent of the injury. An individual with an injury at C1 (the highest cervical vertebra, at the base of the skull) will probably lose function from the neck down and be ventilator-dependent. An individual with a C7 injury may lose function from the chest down but still retain use of the arms and much of the hands. An individual in between, with a C5 injury may lose some function from the chest down and fine motor skills in their hands but still have flexion and extension abilities of certain muscles around the back or arm area.

The extent of the injury is also important. A complete severing of the spinal cord will result in complete loss of function from that vertebra down. A partial severing or even bruising of the spinal cord results in varying degrees of mixed function and paralysis. A common misconception with tetraplegia is that the victim cannot move legs, arms, or any other major body regions; this is often not the case. Some tetraplegics can walk and use their hands, as though they did not have a spinal cord injury, while others may use wheelchairs and retain some functions in their arms and fingers; again, this varies based on the degree of damage to the spinal cord and is mostly seen with incomplete tetraplegia.

It is common to have partial movement in limbs, such as the ability to move the arms but not the hands, or to be able to use the fingers but not to the same extent as before the injury. Furthermore, the deficit in the limbs may not be the same on both sides of the body; either side may be more affected, depending on the location of the lesion on the spinal cord.

Another important factor is the possibility that the patient may exhibit sporadic movement in the affected areas. One of the main causes for this would be myoclonus, or muscle spasms. "After a spinal cord injury, the normal flow of signals is disrupted, and the message does not reach the brain. Instead, the signals are sent back to the motor cells in the spinal cord and cause a reflex muscle spasm. This can result in a twitch, jerk or stiffening of the muscle."

== Causes ==
Tetraplegia is caused by damage to the brain or the spinal cord at a high level. Alternatively, damage to the peripheral nerves caused by such conditions as Guillain-Barré Syndrome or chronic inflammatory demyelinating polyneuropathy (CIDP) will also cause tetraplegia. The nerve injury, which is known as a lesion, causes the loss of partial or total function of all four limbs, meaning the arms and the legs. Typical causes of this damage are trauma (such as a traffic collision, diving into shallow water, a fall, a sports injury), disease (such as transverse myelitis, Guillain–Barré syndrome, multiple sclerosis, or polio), or congenital disorders (such as muscular dystrophy).

Cause	Conditions
Trauma	Motor vehicle accident, falls, violence, recreational activity
Congenital	Spina bifida, spinal muscular atrophy, cerebral palsy
Vascular	Ischemia due to arterial (aortic dissection, atherosclerosis, embolus), venous (thrombosis), or combined (AV malformation) causes
Degenerative	Amyotrophic lateral sclerosis Parkinson's disease
Infectious	Transverse myelitis (from viral, bacterial, or fungal source)
Demyelinating	Multiple sclerosis, Guillain–Barré syndrome

Tetraplegia is defined in many ways; C1–C4 usually affects arm movement more so than a C5–C7 injury; however, all tetraplegics have or have had some kind of finger dysfunction. So, it is not uncommon to have a tetraplegic with fully functional arms but no nervous control of their fingers and thumbs. It is possible to have a broken neck without becoming tetraplegic if the vertebrae are fractured or dislocated but the spinal cord is not damaged. Conversely, it is possible to injure the spinal cord without breaking the spine, for example when a ruptured disc or bone spur on the vertebra protrudes into the spinal column.

== Anatomy and function ==
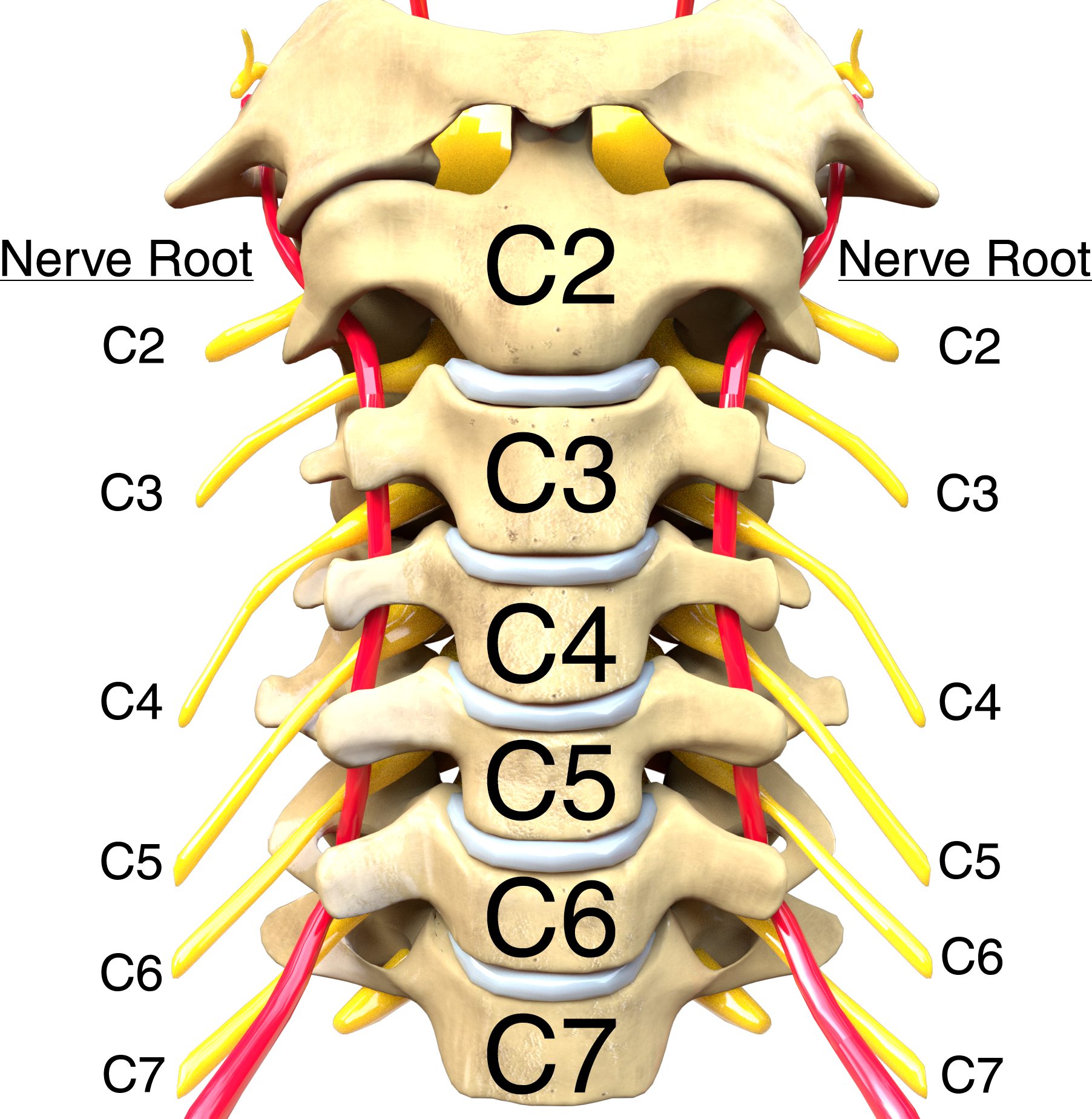
Cervical spine illustration showing the vertebra and nerve roots

Since tetraplegia is typically defined as dysfunction in the cervical spinal cord, this section will focus on the anatomy of the cervical spinal cord. To understand how tetraplegia presents after injury, it is imperative to have a broad knowledge of the cervical spinal roots and its many functions. In the cervical spine, nerve roots exit the spine above the associated vertebra (i.e. the C6 nerve root exits above the C6 vertebra). By evaluating what nerve root of the cervical spine is injured, the affected muscle groups and dermatomes can be determined. This informs the evaluator as to what activities may be limited as a result of the injury. This is typically done at 72 hours post-injury; exams done prior to this time have been found to be inaccurate due to the presence of swelling and other confounding factors. For example, an injury at the C6 nerve root level will affect the function of the triceps (elbow extension) but the biceps (elbow flexion) will be spared; in this case, an injury at the C6 root level affects all function at that level and below whereas the C5 nerve root, which controls the biceps, is spared since it is above the C6 level in the spinal column. When classifying an individual's level of function, there are numerous functional assessment tools that may be used in a clinical setting and it is often up to the clinician's discretion as to which tools are used. A comprehensive list of these tools may be found on the ShirleyRyan AbilityLab website.

Key Muscle Groups and Sensory PointsSpinal Motor & Sensory Innervations
Root	Muscle Group	Root	Sensory Point
C2	-	C2	> 1 cm lateral to the occipital condyle
C3	-	C3	supraclavicular fossa at the midclavicular line
C4	-	C4	Over the acromioclavicular joint
C5	Elbow flexors	C5	Lateral antecubital fossa
C6	Wrist extensors	C6	Dorsal thumb
C7	Elbow extensors	C7	Dorsal middle finger
C8	Long finger flexors	C8	Dorsal little finger
T1	Small finger abductors	T1	Medial epicondyle of the elbow
T2	-	T2	Apex of the axilla

== Diagnosis ==
=== Classification ===
Spinal cord injuries are classified as complete or incomplete by the American Spinal Injury Association (ASIA) classification. The ASIA scale grades patients based on their functional impairment as a result of the injury, grading a patient from A to D. This has considerable consequences for surgical planning and therapy. After a comprehensive neurologic exam testing segments of the body corresponding to spinal nerve roots, the examiner will determine the patient's motor level and sensory level (e.g. motor level C6, sensory level C7). These levels are unique for the patient's left and right side. This level is assigned based on the lowest (closest to the patient's feet) intact motor and sensory level. After this assignment, a neurological level of injury (NLI) is determined. The NLI is the lowest segment with intact sensory and motor function provided there is normal sensory and motor function above this segment.

American Spinal Injury Association Impairment Scale
A	Complete	No motor or sensory function is preserved in the sacral segments S4–S5.
B	Incomplete	Sensory but not motor function is preserved at S4–S5. No motor function is preserved >3 levels below the motor neurological level of injury.
C	Incomplete	Motor function is preserved below the neurological level; more than half of key muscles below the neurological level have a muscle grade less than 3.
D	Incomplete	Motor function is preserved below the neurological level; at least half of key muscles below the neurological level have a muscle grade of 3 or more.

==== Complete spinal-cord lesions ====
As in the above ASIA chart, a complete spinal cord injury is any injury which has absent motor and sensory function in the sacral segments S4 and S5. This is verified during the physical exam by the absence of all three of: voluntary anal contraction, deep anal pressure, and pinprick+light touch sensation in the perineal area. S4 and S5 are both sacral nerve roots found at the lowest portion of the spinal cord. In simpler terms, "complete" is meant as a way to express that the spinal cord is injured such that no signal, motor or sensory, is carried to or from the level of injury to these lower levels of the spinal cord.

==== Incomplete spinal-cord lesions ====
Incomplete spinal cord injuries result in varied post injury presentations. There are three main syndromes described, depending on the exact site and extent of the lesion.

1. Central cord syndrome: an injury to the central area of the spinal cord, most often seen as a result of a fall with subsequent hyperextension injury. This typically presents with weakness greater in the upper limbs than in the lower limbs.
2. Brown-Séquard syndrome: hemisection of the spinal cord with resultant loss in: a.) ipsilateral proprioception, vibration, and motor control below the level of injury b.) complete sensory loss at the level of injury c.) contralateral pain and temperature loss.
3. Anterior cord syndrome: a lesion of the anterior two-thirds of the spinal cord, most commonly due to ischemia. This typically presents with loss of pain, temperature, and motor function at and below the level of injury.
4. Cauda equina syndrome: a lesion of the lumbosacral nerve roots that may spare the spinal cord. As these nerve roots are lower motor neurons, a flaccid lower limb paralysis is typically seen along with loss of bowel and bladder reflexes, varying degrees of impairment of sensation, and loss of sacral reflexes (bulbocavernosus reflex, anal wink).
5. Conus medullaris syndrome: a lesion similar to cauda equina syndrome however this lesion is typically found higher in the cord. This presents clinically similarly to cauda equina syndrome however there may be intact sacral reflexes. Unlike cauda equina, the unique location of this syndrome leads it to present with mixed upper and lower motor neuron signs.

For most patients with ASIA A (complete) tetraplegia, ASIA B (incomplete) tetraplegia and ASIA C (incomplete) tetraplegia, the International Classification level of the patient can be established without great difficulty. The surgical procedures according to the International Classification level can be performed. In contrast, for patients with ASIA D (incomplete) tetraplegia it is difficult to assign an International Classification other than International Classification level X (others). Therefore, it is more difficult to decide which surgical procedures should be performed. A far more personalized approach is needed for these patients. Decisions must be based more on experience than on texts or journals.

The results of tendon transfers for patients with complete injuries are predictable. On the other hand, it is well known that muscles lacking normal excitation perform unreliably after surgical tendon transfers. Despite the unpredictable aspect in incomplete lesions, tendon transfers may be useful. The surgeon should be confident that the muscle to be transferred has enough power and is under good voluntary control. Pre-operative assessment is more difficult to assess in incomplete lesions.

Patients with an incomplete lesion also often need therapy or surgery before the procedure to restore function to correct the consequences of the injury. These consequences are hypertonicity/spasticity, contractures, painful hyperesthesias and paralyzed proximal upper limb muscles with distal muscle sparing.

Spasticity is a frequent consequence of incomplete injuries. Spasticity often decreases function, but sometimes a patient can control the spasticity in a way that it is useful to their function. The location and the effect of the spasticity should be analyzed carefully before treatment is planned. An injection of botulinum toxin (Botox) into spastic muscles is a treatment to reduce spasticity. This can be used to prevent muscle shortening and early contractures.

Over the last ten years, an increase in traumatic incomplete lesions is seen, due to the better protection in traffic.

== Treatment ==
Upper limb paralysis refers to the loss of function of the elbow and hand. When upper limb function is absent as a result of a spinal cord injury it is a major barrier to regain autonomy. People with tetraplegia should be examined and informed concerning the options for reconstructive surgery of the tetraplegic arms and hands.

== Prognosis ==
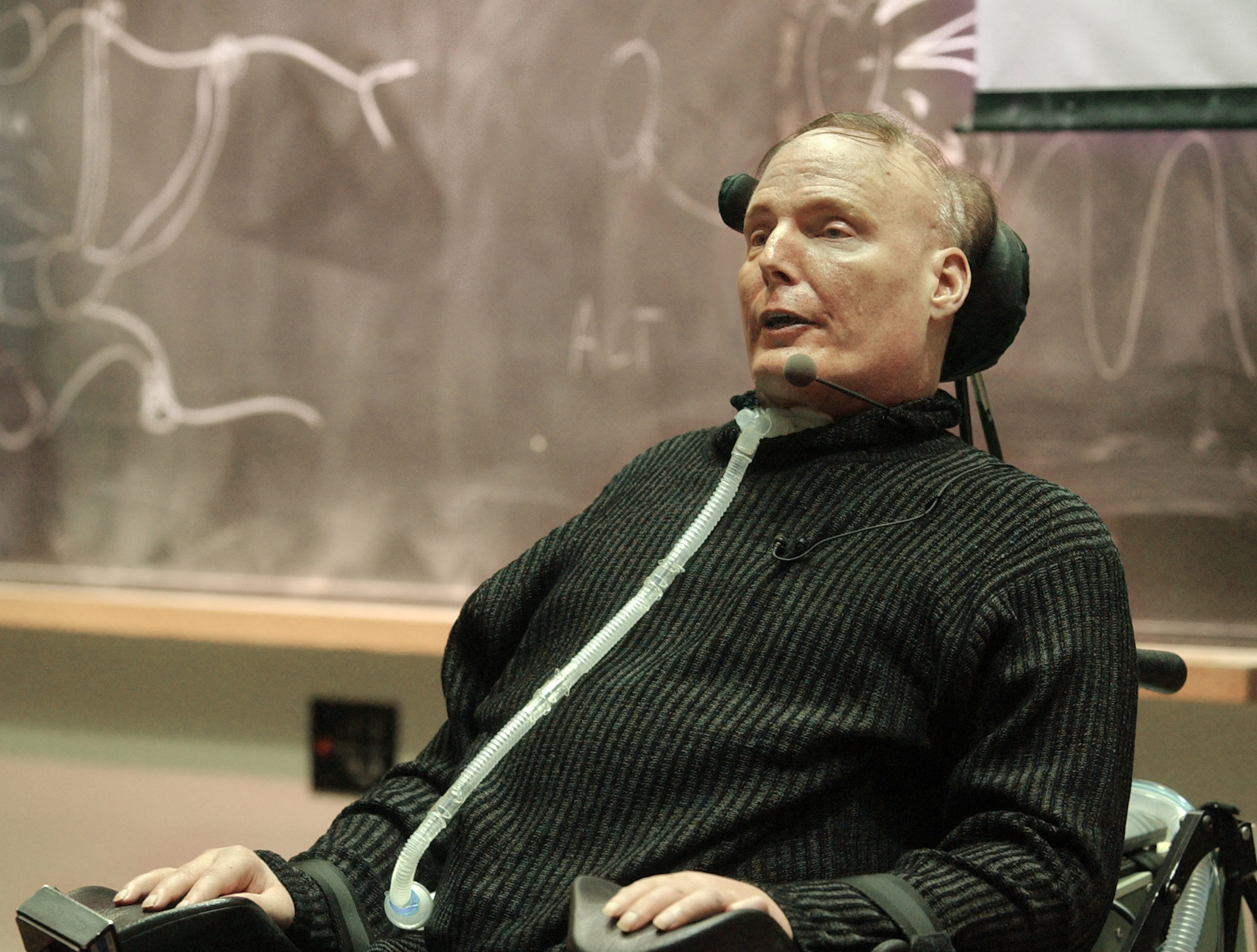
Christopher Reeve speaking at MIT, 2003

Delayed diagnosis of cervical spine injury has grave consequences for the victim. About one in 20 cervical fractures are missed and about two-thirds of these patients have further spinal-cord damage as a result. About 30% of cases of delayed diagnosis of cervical spine injury develop permanent neurological deficits. In high-level cervical injuries, total paralysis from the neck can result. High-level tetraplegics (C4 and higher) will likely need constant care and assistance in activities of daily living (ADLs), such as getting dressed, eating, and bowel/bladder care. Individuals with C5 injuries retain some function in their biceps, deltoids, and other muscles; they typically can perform many ADLs including feeding, bathing, and grooming but require total assistance with bowel/bladder care. The C6 level adds function in the extensor carpi radialis, longus, and other muscles allowing for wrist extension, scapular abduction, and wrist flexion; typically, these patients have modified independent feeding and grooming with adaptive equipment, independent with dressing, can use both a manual and power wheelchair but require assistance with some activities of daily living. The C7 level is where function is retained in the triceps allowing for arm extension; C7 is considered the key level at which most activities can be performed independently with a wheelchair and assistive devices; activities include feeding, grooming, dressing, light meal preparation, and transfers on level surfaces. Even in complete spinal cord injury, it is common for individuals to recover up to 1 level of motor function.

Even with "complete" injuries, in some rare cases, through intensive rehabilitation, function can be regained through "rewiring" neural connections, as in the case of actor Christopher Reeve.

In the case of cerebral palsy, which is caused by damage to the motor cortex either before, during (10%), or after birth, some people with incomplete tetraplegia are gradually able to learn to stand or walk through physical therapy.

Tetraplegics can improve muscle strength by performing resistance training at least three times per week. Combining resistance training with proper nutrition intake can greatly reduce co-morbidities such as obesity and type 2 diabetes.

== Epidemiology ==
There are an estimated 17,700 spinal cord injuries each year in the United States; the total number of people affected by spinal cord injuries is estimated to be approximately 290,000 people.

In the US, spinal cord injuries alone cost approximately $40.5 billion each year, which is a 317 percent increase from costs estimated in 1998 ($9.7 billion).

The estimated lifetime costs for a 25-year-old in 2018 is $3.6 million when affected by low tetraplegia and $4.9 million when affected by high tetraplegia. In 2009, it was estimated that the lifetime care of a 25-year-old rendered with low tetraplegia was about $1.7 million, and $3.1 million with high tetraplegia.

About 1,000 people are affected each year in the UK (~1 in 60,000—assuming a population of 60 million).

== Terminology ==
The condition of paralysis affecting four limbs is alternately termed tetraplegia or quadriplegia. Quadriplegia combines the Latin root quadra, for "four", with the Greek root πληγία plegia, for "paralysis". Tetraplegia uses the Greek root τετρα tetra for "four". In the past, "tetraplegia" and "quadriplegia" were used interchangeably in the medical literature. Medical literature favors using "tetraplegia" as the standardized term, as it is frowned upon to mix Greek and Latin roots, although "quadriplegia" remains in use.

"Tetraplegia", meaning the paralysis of four limbs, may be confused with "tetraparesis", meaning the weakness of four limbs. In medicine, it is important to not use these terms when making a diagnosis. When diagnosing and classifying spinal cord injuries, the ASIA classification is used to distinguish between weakness vs. no weakness, and to classify neurologically complete vs. incomplete lesions. Use of "tetraparesis" is discouraged as it inaccurately describes an incomplete lesion and incorrectly implies tetraplegia applies only to cases of complete lesions.

== See also ==
- Clearing the cervical spine
- Hemiplegia
- Locked-in syndrome
- Sexuality after spinal cord injury
- Spinal cord injury research
