= Clare Rusbridge =

Professor Clare Rusbridge MBE FRCVS
- Occupation: Veterinary Neurologist
- Awards: JA Wight Memorial award (2011); The RCVS Impact Award (2022)

Academic background
- Education: University of Glasgow (BVMS, 1991); Utrecht University (PhD, 2007)
- Thesis: Chiari-like malformation and syringomyelia in the Cavalier King Charles spaniel (2007)

Academic work
- Discipline: Veterinary Neurology, Chiari-like malformation, syringomyelia
- Institutions: University of Surrey; Wear Referrals

Clare Rusbridge is a British veterinary neurologist and researcher known for her work on syringomyelia and Chiari-like malformation in dogs, particularly in the Cavalier King Charles Spaniel breed.

== Education and career ==
Rusbridge began her veterinary studies at the University of Glasgow at the age of 16 and graduated with a Bachelor of Veterinary Medicine and Surgery (BVMS) in 1991. Following an internship at the University of Pennsylvania and a period in general veterinary practice, she completed specialist training in veterinary neurology at the Royal Veterinary College, where she worked as a Staff Clinician in Neurology. She became a Diplomate of the European College of Veterinary Neurology (ECVN) in 1996 and was reported to have been the youngest to achieve this specialist qualification at the time. She was awarded a PhD by Utrecht University in 2007 for research into Chiari-like malformation and syringomyelia in the Cavalier King Charles Spaniel.

Rusbridge operated a neurology and neurosurgery referral service at Stone Lion Veterinary Hospital before joining Fitzpatrick Referrals and the University of Surrey in 2013. She later joined Wear Referrals as a Senior Neurologist while continuing her academic role at the University of Surrey as the Professor of Veterinary Neurology.

== Research ==
Rusbridge's research focuses on inherited and acquired neurological diseases in companion animals. Her work has particularly examined Chiari-like malformation, syringomyelia, neuropathic pain, epilepsy, and other neurological disorders affecting dogs.

Her research into Chiari-like malformation and syringomyelia contributed to improved understanding of these conditions, including their diagnosis, treatment, and prevention. She has authored or co-authored more than 280 scientific articles and book chapters, and has contributed to veterinary and medical education.

== Honours ==
Rusbridge received the JA Wight Memorial Award in 2011. She was elected a Fellow of the Royal College of Veterinary Surgeons in 2016 for her contribution to veterinary knowledge and received the RCVS Impact Award in 2022.

== Professional activities ==
Rusbridge is involved in veterinary education and public communication, including resources on neurological conditions affecting companion animals. She has also served in charitable roles connected with animal health and welfare.
