= Monica Daley =

Biomechanics and neuromechanics researcher

Monica A. Daley
- Education: University of Utah (BS); Harvard University (MA, PhD)
- Known for: Research on stable and agile bipedal locomotion; bio-inspired robotics collaborations
- Awards: Fellow, American Society of Biomechanics
- Scientific career
- Fields: Biomechanics; Neuromechanics
- Workplaces: University of California, Irvine; Royal Veterinary College

Monica A. Daley is a biomechanics and neuromechanics researcher and professor at the University of California, Irvine (UCI). She studies how humans and animals achieve stable and agile movement, particularly during unsteady locomotion and how principles from animal movement can inform engineering and rehabilitation. She is also an editor for the Journal of Experimental Biology and currently the Director of the Integrative Movement Sciences Institute (IMSI), an NSF Biology Integration Institute focused on understanding muscle control during rapid, unsteady movement across organizational scales and across species.

== Education and training ==
Daley earned a BS in Biology from the University of Utah (1999) and an MA (2003) and PhD (2006) in Organismic and Evolutionary Biology from Harvard University. She held an NSF Postdoctoral Fellowship at the University of Michigan (2006–2008).

== Academic appointments ==
From 2008 to 2019, Daley held a faculty position in the Structure and Motion Laboratory at the Royal Veterinary College in the United Kingdom. She later joined UCI’s Department of Ecology and Evolutionary Biology and holds joint appointments in Biomedical Engineering and Mechanical & Aerospace Engineering.

== Research ==
Daley’s research integrates biomechanics, neuromuscular physiology, and sensorimotor control to study terrestrial locomotion, often using ground-dwelling birds to investigate stable and agile bipedal movement and its underlying control strategies. Her work has been linked to bio-inspired robotics efforts; for example, her research on avian locomotion has been cited in reporting on BirdBot, an avian-inspired bipedal robot developed through collaborations spanning biomechanics and robotics.

== Editorial and professional service ==
Daley joined the editorial advisory board of the Journal of Experimental Biology in 2017 and became an editor in 2021. She served as an associate editor for Royal Society Open Science (2014–2020) and has served in leadership roles within the Comparative Neuromuscular Biomechanics group associated with the International Society of Biomechanics.

Daley has also served in academic leadership roles at UCI, including appointment as Equity Advisor for the Charlie Dunlop School of Biological Sciences (effective September 2022).

== Honors ==
Daley is a Fellow of the American Society of Biomechanics.

== Selected publications ==
- Daley, M. A. & Biewener, A. A. (2006). "Running over rough terrain reveals limb control for intrinsic stability." Proceedings of the National Academy of Sciences. 103: 15681–15686.
- Badri-Spröwitz, A. et al. (2022). "BirdBot achieves energy-efficient gait with minimal control using avian-inspired leg clutching." Science Robotics.
- Ijspeert, A. J. & Daley, M. A. (2023). "Integration of feedforward and feedback control in the neuromechanics of vertebrate locomotion: a review of experimental, simulation and robotic studies." Journal of Experimental Biology.
