= Smousje =

Smousje is a group of companion dog breeds, originally from Belgium. More specifically, it may refer to the specific breeds:

- Griffon Bruxellois also known as the Brussels Griffon (FCI #80)
- Belgian Griffon also known as the Griffon Belge (FCI #81)
- Brabancon Griffon also known as the Petit Brabançon (FCI #82)
