= Paul Loye =

French physician (1861–1890)

Paul Loye (1861–1890) was a French physician and "préparateur" for various physiological courses at the Sorbonne in the 1880s. His greatest contribution lay in his observations on the functions and organization of the brain and nervous system.

As a medical graduate student in Paris, Loye attempted to confirm the observations of Charles-Édouard Brown-Séquard on the nervous system. Brown-Séquard had argued that all motor activity rested in the brain and operated through the nervous system alone. To observe the importance of the brain in the activity of the body, Loye constructed a guillotine in the laboratory of the Sorbonne and decapitated several hundred dogs and other animals, recording the extent of each animal's movement after decapitation. Through these experiments, Loye concluded that the loss of complete consciousness and brain death occurred immediately after decapitation, but various parts of the body, such as the heart, continued to work for several minutes as a reflex action. This confirmed the less-refined observations of Jean Baptiste Vincent Laborde who had experimented upon decapitated human heads in the early 1880s.

Almost nothing is known of Loye's personal life. He once served as an assistant to the physiologist Paul Bert, whose imperialistic views he admired. Loye traveled with Laborde to various executions in Paris and the north of France. Loye had arrived as a student at the Sorbonne from a rural area southwest of Paris, and died shortly after completing his 1886 doctoral dissertation.

== See also ==
- Brown-Séquard syndrome
