= Long Island Veterinary Specialists =

Coordinates: 40°47′8″N 73°26′57″W

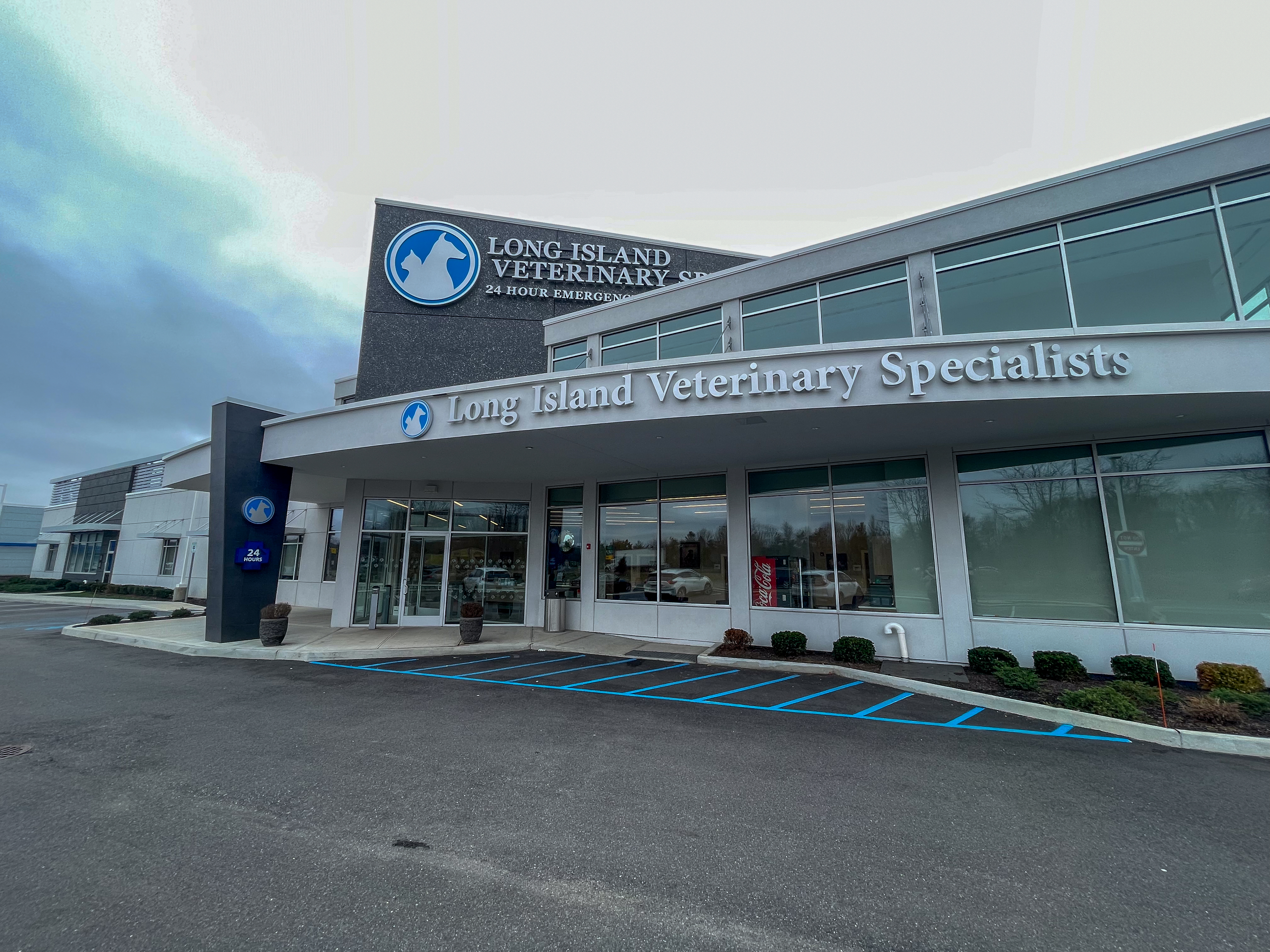
Long Island Veterinary Specialists in 2024

Long Island Veterinary Specialists is a veterinary specialty center located in Plainview, Long Island, New York.

== History ==
LIVS was first located in Levittown, NY and was previously called “Island Veterinary Referral.” Dr. Meyer Kaplan, veterinary surgeon and owner of Levittown Animal Hospital, and Dr. John Sapienza, veterinary ophthalmologist, formed Island Veterinary Referral in 1993. Dr. Dominic J. Marino, veterinary surgeon, and Dr. Rada Panich, veterinary dermatologist, joined Island Veterinary Referral the same year. In June 1998, Island Veterinary Referral changed their name to Long Island Veterinary Specialists. At the time, LIVS was Long Island's first veterinary specialist center with a CT scanner and a fully equipped emergency and critical care center. The Center at LIVS contains an active Neurology/Neurosurgery department and one of the only “electronic brachytherapy” treatment facility for pet cancer.

Among the noteworthy accomplishments of Long Island Veterinary Specialists is their work with canine Chiari-like malformation and syringomyelia. The clinicians at Long Island Veterinary Specialists have made advances in the diagnosis and medical management of pets with CM as well as other abnormalities of the craniocervical junction. Some of these advances are made possible using MR imaging to evaluate and the development of a thermal camera-based screening test.

Before the introduction of MRI, CM and SM were commonly confused with allergic skin disorders, degenerative disc disease, ear infections and epilepsy. After CM was reported in human patients, the initial research was provided for the diagnosis of animals.

On July 13, 2012, Dr. Dominic J. Marino, Chief of Staff at Long Island Veterinary Specialists was featured in a New York Times feature story for hosting and conducting a two-day combat training course for the Air Force Pararescuers from the USAF (United States Air Force)/NYANG (New York Air National Guard), and their service canines. The training session, spanning two days at the LIVS facility consisted of lectures, demonstration labs, and tactical drills to teach pararescuers how to treat canines in crisis situations.

== Legal proceedings and controversy ==
=== Lawsuit alleging unnecessary procedures and patient death (2019) ===
In 2019, a civil lawsuit was filed against Long Island Veterinary Specialists in connection with the death of a patient's dog following MRI procedures performed at the Plainview facility. The case was reported by The City, a nonprofit investigative news organization covering New York.

According to The City's reporting on the lawsuit, the suit charged that a physician at LIVS "lied about her expertise, ordered an unnecessary — and dangerous — MRI and proposed risky surgery designed to make more money." The plaintiff alleged the dog, a 14-year-old rescue animal, had been assessed by veterinarians at the Animal Medical Center in Manhattan as having arthritis, and that the MRI procedures were not medically indicated. The lawsuit further alleged that following the procedures the dog was left paralyzed, and that the facility discouraged transfer to another hospital while the animal's condition deteriorated.

The International Business Times reported that the lawsuit alleged LIVS maintained an "office culture of pushing unnecessary, inappropriate and lucrative services…designed primarily to maximize LIVS's profits." According to IBTimes' reporting on the lawsuit, court documents alleged the dog was "forced into a position that damaged the spine and left it paralyzed," and that a LIVS technician told the plaintiff she had "seen this [paralysis] happen before and it is because of how they twist and position the dog for the MRI."

LIVS denied all allegations. The facility's attorney, Alexander Bateman Jr., stated that the clinic's doctors "are always scrupulous in treating pets in their care" and that veterinarians who considered the MRI unnecessary "are either lacking in sufficient education and experience, or were provided incomplete and inaccurate information."

The plaintiff filed a complaint against Long Island Veterinary Specialists with the New York State Education Department's Office of Professional Discipline, which oversees licensed veterinarians in New York State, and worked with the office of State Senator Liz Krueger on proposed legislative reforms relating to veterinary oversight and the legal classification of companion animals.

A contemporaneous report by the New York Post in July 2019 described an additional dog death alleged to have followed an MRI procedure at a Long Island veterinary facility.

=== 2025 billing allegations ===
In August 2025, the New York Post reported that pet owners alleged a Long Island animal hospital had charged $2,500 per night for care while providing inaccurate information about their animal's condition, discovering the true state of their pet only upon arrival at the facility.

=== New York State veterinary regulatory context ===
In April 2019, The City and NBC New York published a joint investigation into veterinary discipline in New York State, finding that the New York Board of Regents had taken 70 disciplinary actions against approximately 6,679 licensed veterinarians and 5,383 veterinary technicians between November 2013 and February 2019. The investigation reported that veterinarians found to have made errors in patient care were often permitted to return to practice within months, without mandatory retraining or public disclosure requirements during suspension periods. The director of investigations at the Office of Professional Discipline acknowledged in response to a Freedom of Information Law request that he lacked resources to review 1,202 outstanding complaint files, with some cases having dragged on for more than five years.

A subsequent City investigation in April 2022 reported that New York remained one of only 13 U.S. states classifying companion animals as personal property under the law, a designation that limits recoverable damages in veterinary malpractice cases to the market value of the animal and makes legal action financially impractical in many circumstances. Advocacy groups and pet owners have lobbied the New York State Legislature to reclassify companion animals as sentient beings, which would expand available legal remedies, though such legislation had not passed as of 2025.
