= Griffon Bruxellois =

Dog breed originally from Brussels, Belgium

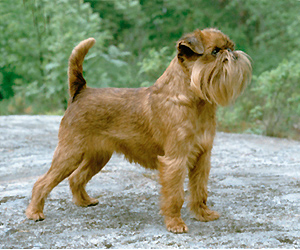
- A Griffon Bruxellois
- Other names: Brussels Griffon; Belgium Griffon; Petit Brabançon; Griffon Belge; Brabançon Griffon
- Common nicknames: Griffon; Griff; Bruss
- Origin: Belgium
Kennel club standards
- Société Royale Saint-Hubert: standard
- Fédération Cynologique Internationale: standard

The Griffon Bruxellois or Brussels Griffon is a breed of toy dog, named for their city of origin of Brussels, Belgium. The Griffon Bruxellois may refer to three different breeds, the Griffon Bruxellois, the Griffon Belge and the Petit Brabançon. Identical in standard except for coat and colour differences, in some standards they are considered varieties of the same breed, much like Belgian Shepherd Dogs.

== History ==
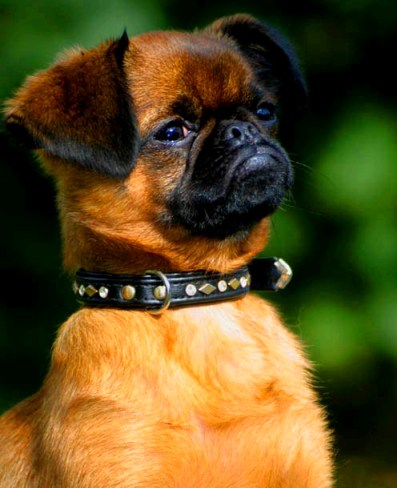
Shorthaired Petit Brabançon

The three variations of the Griffon Bruxellois, the Brussels Griffon (Griffon Bruxellois), the Belgian Griffon (Griffon Belge), and the Petit Brabançon, all descend from dog called a Smousje, a rough coated, small terrier-like dog kept in stables to eliminate rodents, similar to the Dutch Smoushond. The little coarse-haired dog in the foreground of the Jan van Eyck painting The Arnolfini Marriage is thought to be an early form of this breed. In Belgium, coachmen were fond of their alert little Griffons d'Ecurie (wiry coated stable dogs) and in the 19th century, they bred their Griffons with imported toy dogs. Breeding with the Pug and King Charles Spaniel brought about the current breed type, but also brought the short black coat that led to the Petits Brabançon, which was originally a fault in the breed. The spaniels also brought the rich red and black and tan colour of the modern Griffon Bruxellois and Griffon Belge.

The Griffon Bruxellois grew in popularity in the late 19th century with both workers and noblemen in Belgium. The first Griffon Bruxellois was registered in 1883 in the first volume Belgium's kennel club studbook, the Livre des Origines Saint-Hubert (LOSH). The popularity of the breed was increased by the interest of Queen Marie Henriette, a dog enthusiast who visited the annual dog shows in Belgium religiously, often with her daughter, and became a breeder and booster of Griffon Bruxellois, giving them international fame and popularity. Many dogs were exported to other countries, leading to Griffon Bruxellois clubs in England (1897) and Brussels Griffon clubs in the United States (1945).

The First World War and Second World War proved to be a disastrous time for the breed. The recovering numbers of the breed after the First World War were set back by increased vigilance in breeding away from faults such as webbed toes. By the end of the Second World War, Belgium had almost no native Griffon Bruxellois left, and it was only through the vigilance of dedicated breeders (in the UK particularly) that the breed survived at all.

The breed has never been numerous or popular, but had a brief vogue in the late 1950s, and now is generally an uncommon breed. There has been a recent increase in interest in the United States due to the appearance of a Griffon in the movie As Good as It Gets.

== Description ==
The Griffon Bruxellois is typically a small breed with a sturdy frame. The average adult Griffon stands from 9–11 inches (230–280 mm) tall, and weighs 8–10 pounds (4–5 kg). They have domed heads, short noses, and an underbite. Their human-like facial features were the inspiration for the Ewok.

The Griffon comes in two coat variants, wiry/rough and smooth coat. Their fur can be red, black and tan, or black and reddish in color. The short hair Griffon requires little grooming while the wiry/rough coat Griffon requires weekly grooming attention.

Often, breeders will dock tails and crop ears on puppies for sale. This practice is illegal in most of Europe and increasingly frowned on in the United States, but still practiced in some places.

=== Temperament ===
The Fédération Cynologique Internationale describes the Griffon Bruxellois as a well-balanced dog, proud, alert, not timid nor aggressive, and very attached to its owner. The AKC also states that they have a low threshold for loneliness, and a very sensitive nature that leads them to reply poorly to harsh corrections or training methods. Griffons tend to be curious and are endowed with great memory and cleanliness.

Griffons tend to bond with one human more than others, and are very good with children provided they are not teased. They are not very patient but love to play. Griffons tend to get along well with other animals in the house, including cats, ferrets, and other dogs. However, they have no concept of their own relative size and may attempt to dominate dogs much larger than themselves.

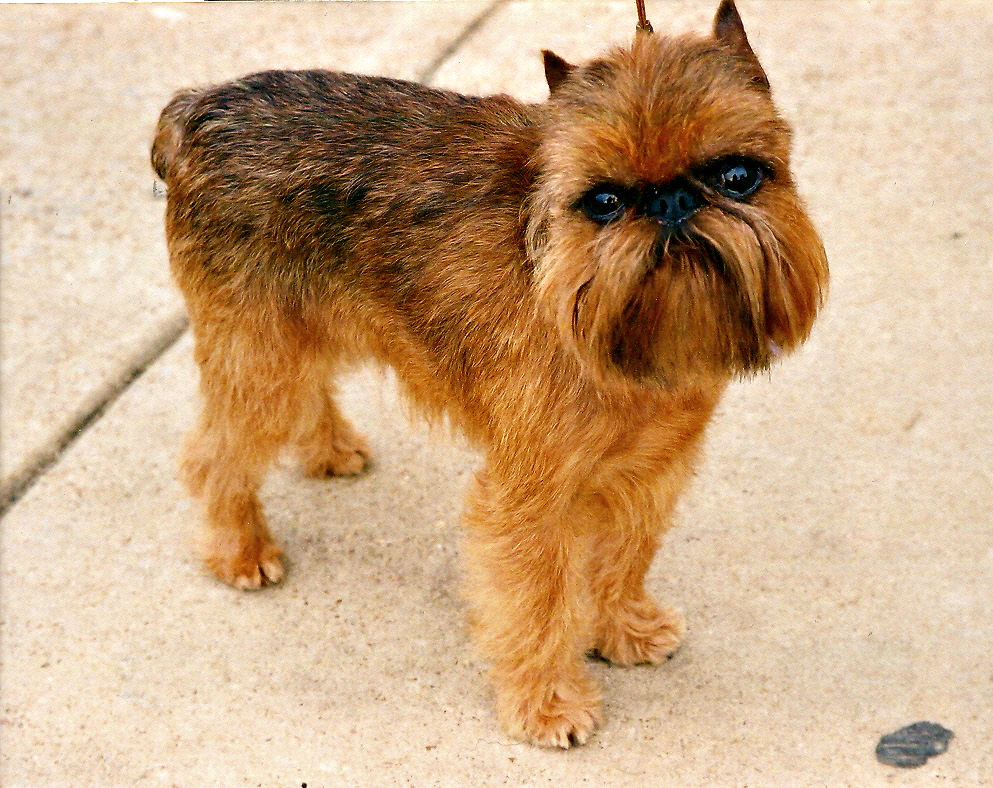
A brown Griffon Bruxellois with beard and cropped ears

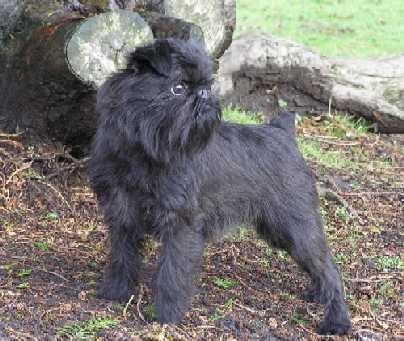
Griffon Belge

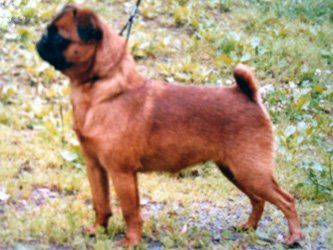
Petit Brabançon

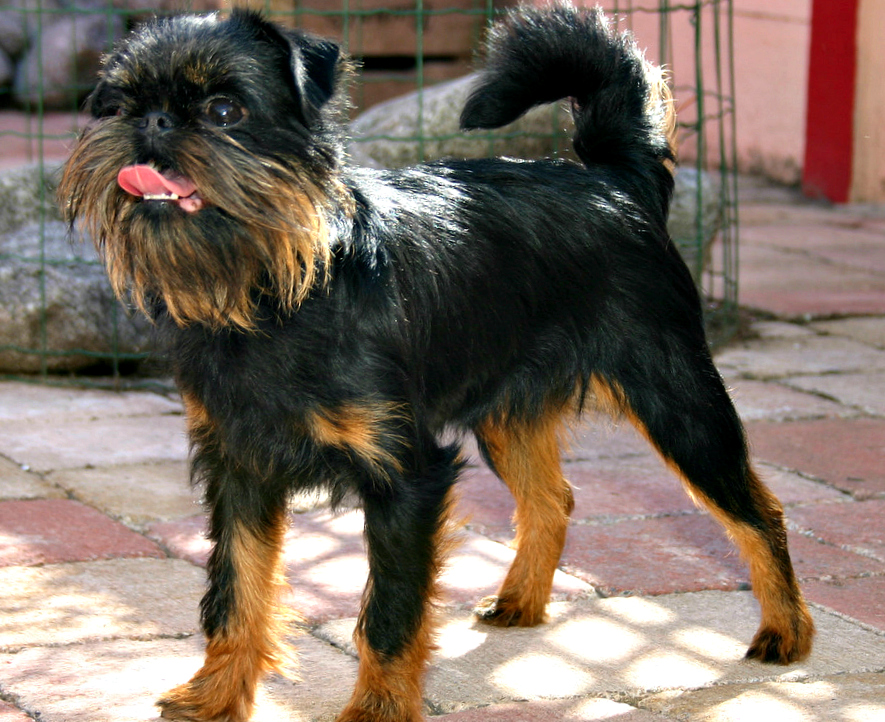
Brussels Griffon

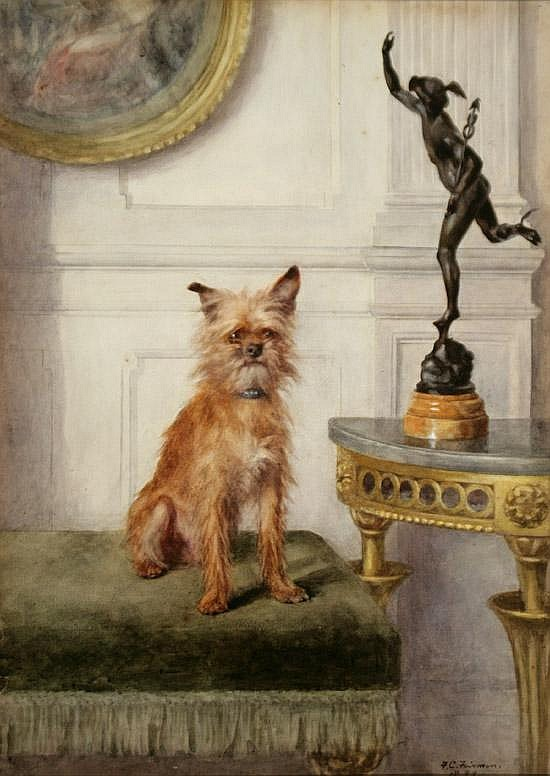
Walter Palmer, Brussels Griffon by Frances C. Fairman, 1899

== Health ==
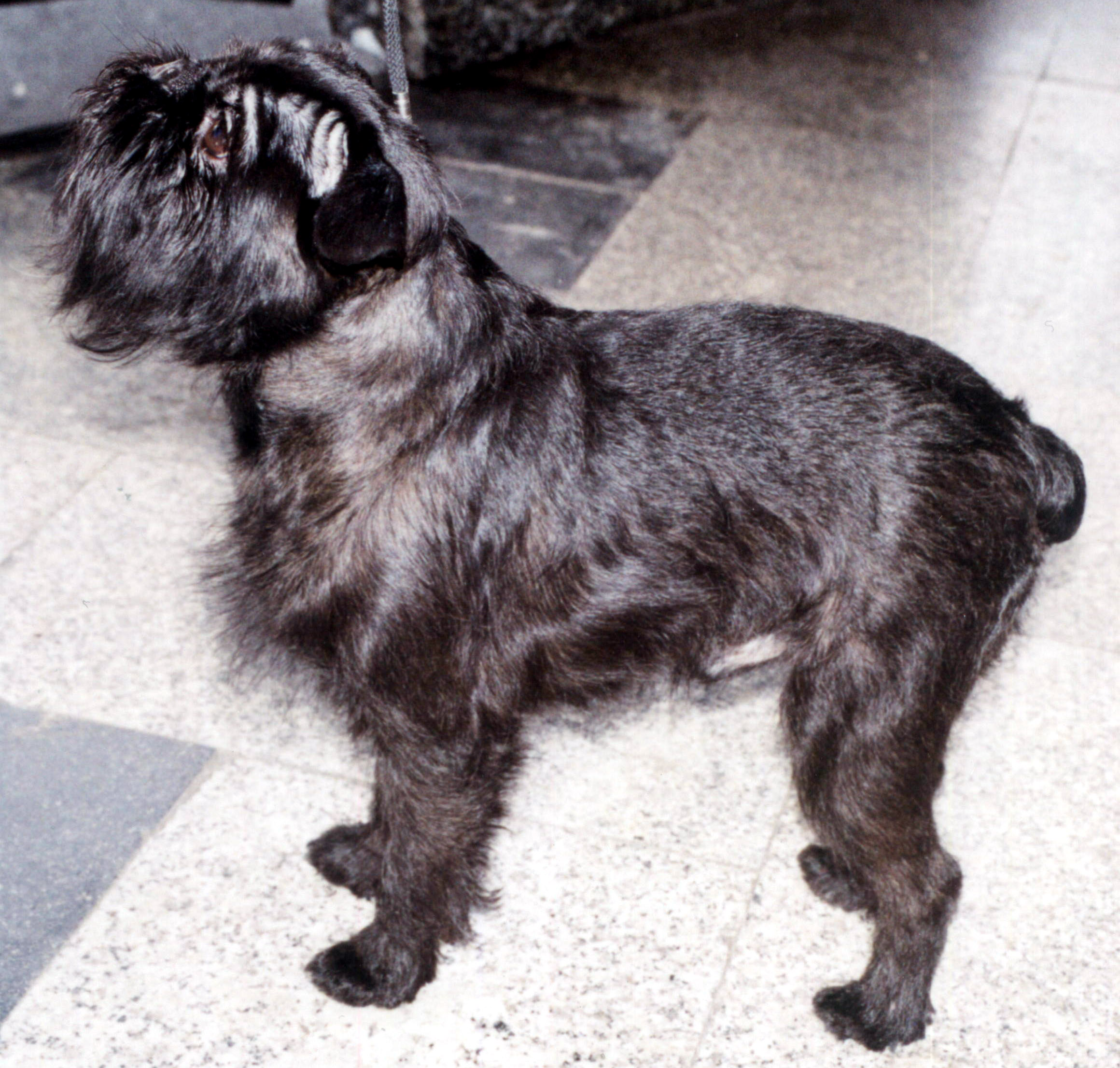
Griffon Bruxellois

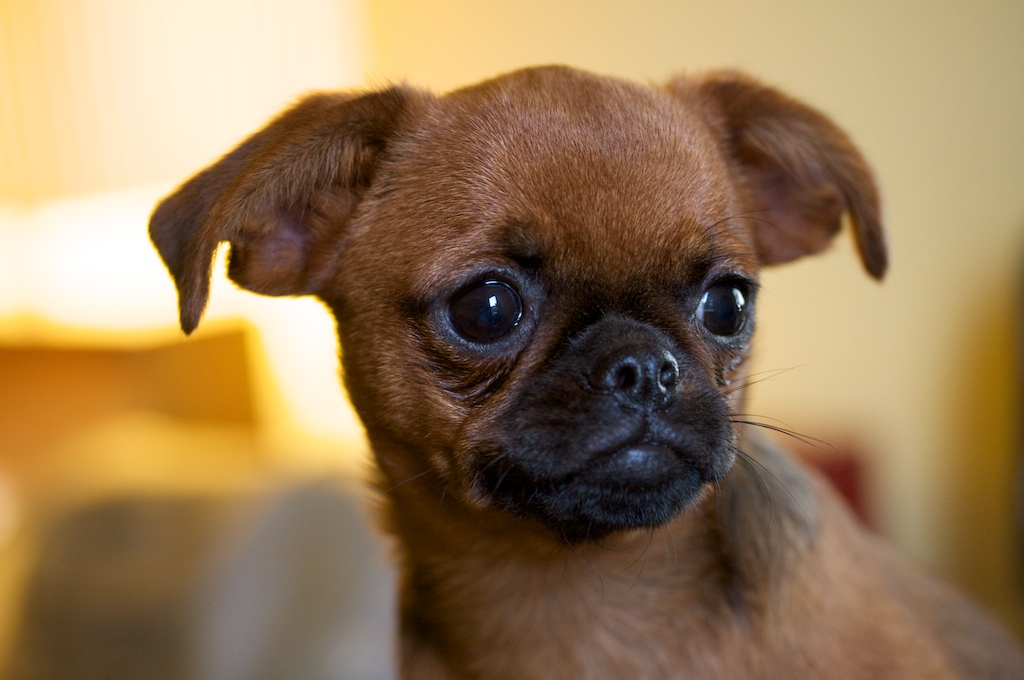
Petit Brabançon puppy

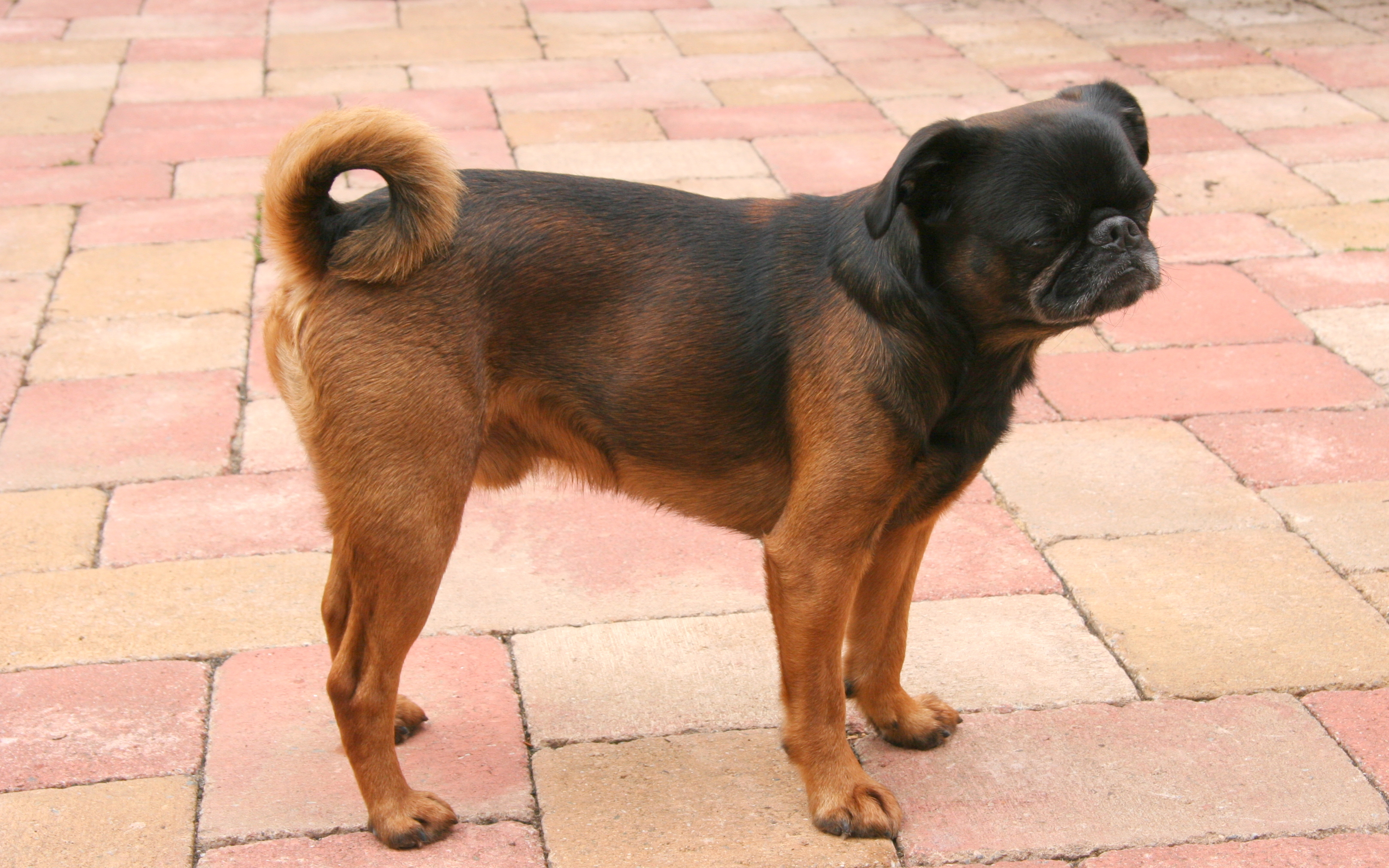
Petit Brabançon

Griffons should be tested for congenital defects, the most serious of which are Syringomyelia (SM) and Chiari-like malformation (CM). A 2024 UK study found a life expectancy of 13.3 years for the breed compared to an average of 12.7 for purebreeds and 12 for crossbreeds.

=== Birthing ===
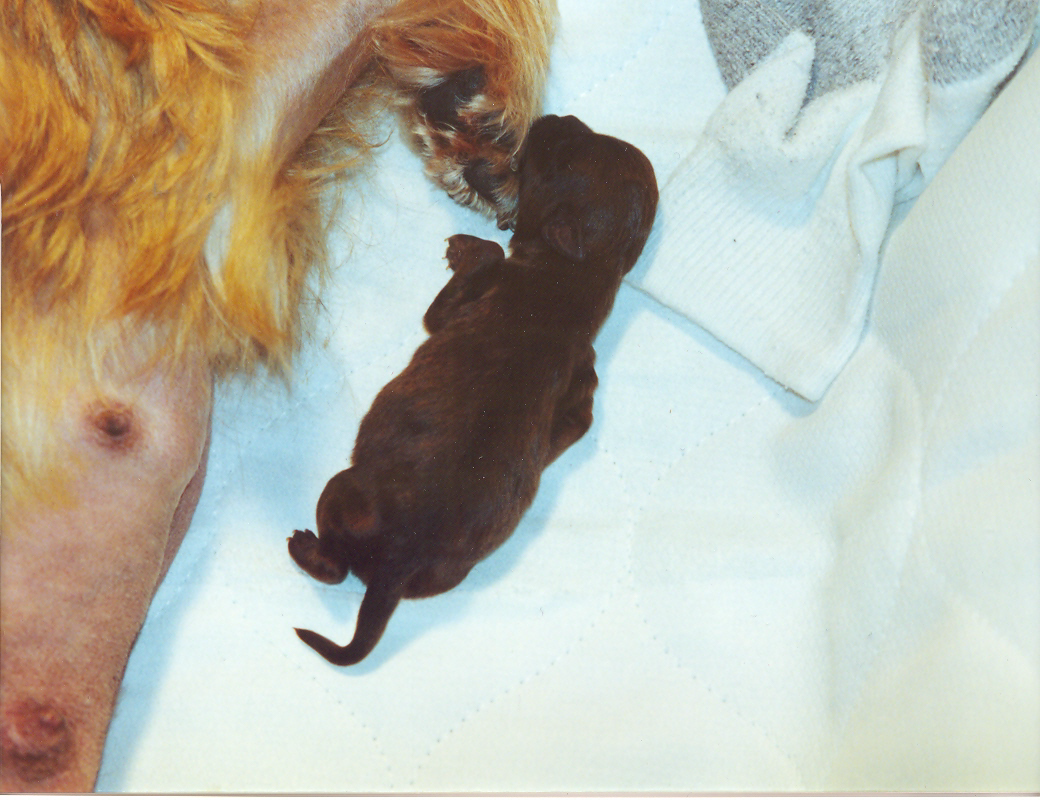
A Griffon puppy

Griffons usually have no trouble whelping on their own, but sometimes complications can necessitate a Caesarean section. The size of a litter is anything from 1–10 puppies (average around 4–5). The size of the litter often determines the extent of these complications. When they are born, the puppies weigh only a few ounces (about 100 grams (3.5 oz)) and are small enough to fit in the palm of an adult's hand.

=== Cleft palate ===
One issue that is typically fatal for the puppies is having a cleft palate. It results in the puppy not receiving nourishment from the mother and eventually starvation. It is uncommon but, depending on the size of the cleft, it is possible for the puppy to survive. When it becomes older, surgery can be done to close the hole.

=== Eyes ===
Most have large eyes that may require rechecks from a veterinarian.

- Lacerations – Lacerations are a common issue amongst the breed. Because the Griffons have such large eyes and a short snout, there is very little there to protect their vision from foreign bodies. If a laceration is left untreated it can result in blindness.
- Cataracts – As with most breeds, cataracts are a common problem as the dog ages. For many breeders it is a disappointment that the cataracts typically develop long after the dog has already been bred.
- Lens Luxations – Lens luxations can be fairly common in the breed and result in secondary glaucoma
- Glaucoma – Glaucoma can also be a common issue amongst Griffons owing to the breed's facial features and eye size.

=== Syringomyelia ===
Syringomyelia (SM) is a condition affecting the brain and spine, causing symptoms ranging from mild discomfort to severe pain and partial paralysis. Syringomyelia is characterised by fluid filled cavities within the spinal cord. SM occurs secondary to obstruction of cerebrospinal fluid (CSF) especially if that obstruction is at the foramen magnum.

Not all dogs with SM have clinical signs. The presence of signs is correlated to the width of the syrinx and extent of spinal cord dorsal horn damage. Syrinxes can progressively expand and a dog which is asymptomatic in early life may eventually experience pain.

Chiari-like malformation (CM) may occur as a predisposing factor to SM. According to a study, 61.7% of Griffons with SM had CM.

== See also ==
- List of dog breeds
- Toy Group
- Companion Group
- Lap dog
- Dutch Smoushond
- Griffon (dog type)
