= Syringobulbia =

Medical condition

- Specialty: Neurology
- Symptoms: Pain, loss of temperature sensation, breathing problems
- Causes: Unknown, may be widening of central canal of spinal cord
- Diagnostic method: Symptoms, magnetic resonance imaging
- Medication: Tricyclic antidepressants for pain

Syringobulbia is a medical condition in which syrinxes, or fluid-filled cavities, affect the brainstem (usually the lower brainstem). The exact cause is often unknown, but may be linked to a widening of the central canal of the spinal cord. This may affect one or more cranial nerves, resulting in various kinds of facial palsies. Sensory and motor nerve pathways may be affected by interruption or compression of nerves. This disorder is associated with syringomyelia, a syrinx limited to the spinal cord. It can be diagnosed using magnetic resonance imaging. Symptoms may be treated with tricyclic antidepressants.

== Signs and symptoms ==
Syringobulbia usually causes pain. It may also cause a loss of sense of temperature. Alveolar hypoventilation (insufficient breathing, a type of central hypoventilation syndrome) may occur, with hypercapnia (excess blood CO_{2}), stridor (an unusual breathing sound), and irregular breathing.

== Cause ==
Syringobulbia may be caused by a birth defect, trauma or tumor growth. The exact trigger is unknown, but may be linked to a widening of the central canal of the spinal cord.

== Mechanism ==
Syringobulbia affects the lower part of the brainstem. The central canal of the spinal cord may be widened. A fluid-filled lesion forms, known as a syrinx. This can vary in size significantly between patients. Nerve fibres may be compressed where they cross the midline, or in other parts of the spinal cord. Cranial nerves may be affected.

Syringobulbia may be associated with syringomyelia, a syrinx limited to the spinal cord.

== Diagnosis ==
Syringobulbia may be diagnosed using magnetic resonance imaging.

== Treatment ==
The pain caused by syringobulbia may be treated with tricyclic antidepressants.

== See also ==
- Syrinx
- Syringomyelia
