= Central cord syndrome =

Human spinal cord disorder

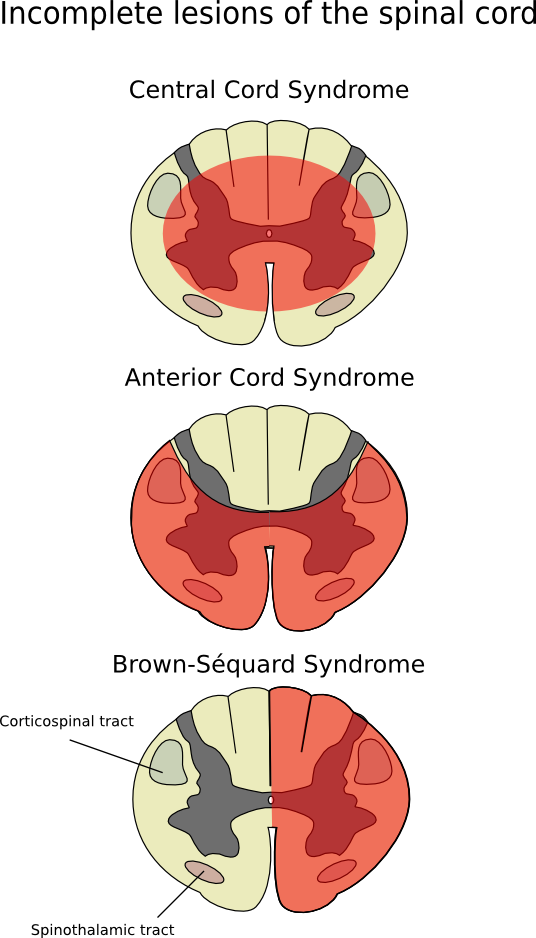
- Central cord syndrome is the top diagram
- Specialty: Neurology; Neurosurgery

Central cord syndrome (CCS) is the most common form of cervical spinal cord injury (SCI). It is characterized by loss of power and sensation in arms and hands. It usually results from trauma which causes damage to the neck, leading to major injury to the central corticospinal tract of the spinal cord. CCS most frequently occurs among older persons with cervical spondylosis, however, it also may occur in younger individuals.

CCS is the most common incomplete spinal cord injury syndrome. It accounts for approximately 9% of traumatic SCIs. After an incomplete injury, the brain still has the capacity to send and receive some signals below the site of injury. Sending and receiving of signals to and from parts of the body is reduced, not entirely blocked. CCS gives a greater motor loss in the upper limbs than in the lower limbs, with variable sensory loss.

It was first described by Schneider in 1954. It is generally associated with favorable prognosis for some degree of neurological and functional recovery. However, factors such as age, preexisting conditions, and extent of injury will affect the recovery process.

== Presentation ==
CCS is characterized by disproportionately greater motor impairment in upper compared to lower extremities, due to the more centrally located anterior grey column containing the motor neurons of the upper extremity. CCS also has a classic presentation of "dissociated sensory loss", specifically pain and temperature, due to involvement of the centrally located anterior white commissure containing decussating fibers of the spinothalamic tract at the affected level. A variable degree of sensory loss below the level of injury in combination with bladder dysfunction and urinary retention may also occur

== Causes ==
In older patients, CCS most often occurs after acute hyperextension injury in an individual with long-standing cervical spondylosis. A slow, chronic cause in this age group is when the cord gets caught and squeezed between a posterior intervertebral disc herniation against the anterior cord and/or with posterior pressure on the cord from hypertrophy of the ligamentum flavum (Lhermitte's sign may be the experience that causes the patient to seek medical diagnosis). However, CCS is not exclusive to older patients as younger individuals can also sustain an injury leading to CCS. Typically, younger patients are more likely to get CCS as a result of a high-force trauma or a bony instability in the cervical spine. Historically, spinal cord damage was believed to originate from concussion or contusion of the cord with stasis of axoplasmic flow, causing edematous injury rather than destructive hematomyelia. More recently, autopsy studies have demonstrated that CCS may be caused by bleeding into the central part of the cord, portending less favorable prognosis. Studies also have shown from postmortem evaluation that CCS probably is associated with selective axonal disruption in the lateral columns at the level of the injury to the spinal cord with relative preservation of the grey matter.

== Diagnosis ==
A patient presenting with signs and symptoms of CCS should undergo imaging of their spinal axis via CT or MRI to determine whether a structural abnormality is causing the symptoms. If imaging does not show an abnormality, consultation with a neurologist for further testing such as nerve conduction studies is warranted.

== Management ==
=== Nonsurgical ===
In many cases, individuals with CCS can experience a reduction in their neurological symptoms with conservative management. The first steps of these intervention strategies include admission to an intensive care unit (ICU) after initial injury. After entering the ICU, early immobilization of the cervical spine with a neck collar would be placed on the patient to limit the potential of further injury. Cervical spine restriction is maintained for approximately six weeks until the individual experiences a reduction in pain and neurological symptoms. Inpatient rehabilitation is initiated in the hospital setting, followed by outpatient physical therapy and occupational therapy to assist with recovery.

An individual with a spinal cord injury may have many goals for outpatient occupational and physiotherapy. Their level of independence, self-care, and mobility are dependent on their degree of neurological impairment. Rehabilitation organization and outcomes are also based on these impairments. The physiatrist, along with the rehabilitation team, work with the patient to develop specific, measurable, action-oriented, realistic, and time-centered goals.

With respect to physical therapy interventions, it has been determined that repetitive task-specific sensory input can improve motor output in patients with central cord syndrome. These activities enable the spinal cord to incorporate both supraspinal and afferent sensory information to help recover motor output. This occurrence is known as "activity dependent plasticity". Activity dependent plasticity is stimulated through such activities as: locomotor training, muscle strengthening, voluntary cycling, and functional electrical stimulation (FES) cycling.

=== Surgical ===
Surgical intervention is usually given to those individuals who have increased instability of their cervical spine, which cannot be resolved by conservative management alone. Further indications for surgery include a neurological decline in spinal cord function in stable patients as well as those who require cervical spinal decompression.

== See also ==
- Spinal cord injury
- Anterior cord syndrome
- Posterior cord syndrome
- Brown-Séquard syndrome
