= Dutch Smoushond =

Dutch breed of dog

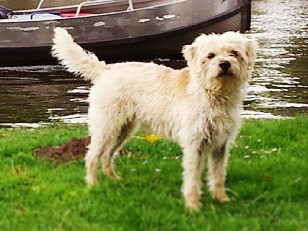
- Other names: Dutch Ratter; Hollandse Smoushond
- Origin: Netherlands
Kennel club standards
- Dutch Kennel Club: standard
- Fédération Cynologique Internationale: standard

The Dutch Smoushond or Hollandse Smoushond is a breed of small ratting dog. It is related to the Pinscher and Schnauzer breed type formerly kept in stables to eliminate rats and mice. It is rare and not well known outside the Netherlands. It was fully accepted by the Fédération Cynologique Internationale in 1981.

== History ==
The Hollandse Smoushond Club (Smoushondenclub) was formed in 1905 to document and register the small stable dog as a purebred breed, as it was in danger of dying out. Its origins may have been with the ancestor of the Schnauzer breed, as an incorrect yellow colour. The name refers to its shaggy fur and face, as Jewish men (called Smouzen in the 1800s, a slur deriving from the name Moses) had beards and long hair. They were called "Dutch" to prevent confusion with the similar Brussels Griffons. During World War II, the breed nearly disappeared. In 1973, several breeders began to reconstruct the breed with the few remaining dogs, most of whom had been crossbred with other breeds. Much of the reconstruction was accomplished with the use of Border Terrier crosses.

The re-created breed was definitively accepted by the Fédération Cynologique Internationale in 1981.

== Appearance ==
The Dutch Smoushond is small in size, at the maximum 10 kg in weight and 43 cm in height at the withers. Its waterproof coat is rough and shaggy, and of any shade of yellow colour. The characteristic shape of the head is broad and short, with drop ears set high on the head.
