= Syrinx (medicine) =

Rare, fluid-filled neuroglial cavity

A syrinx is a rare, fluid-filled neuroglial cavity within the spinal cord (syringomyelia), in the brain stem (syringobulbia), or in the nerves of the elbow, usually in a young age.

== Presentation ==
Symptoms usually begin insidiously between adolescence and age 45. Syringomyelia develops in the center of the spinal cord, causing a central cord syndrome. Pain and temperature sensory deficits occur early but may not be recognized for years. The first abnormality recognized may be a painless burn or cut. Syringomyelia typically causes weakness, atrophy, and often fasciculations and hyperreflexia of the hands and arms; a deficit in pain and temperature sensation in a capelike distribution over the shoulders, arms and back is characteristic. Light touch and position and vibration sensation are not affected. Later, spastic leg weakness develops. Deficits may be asymmetric.

Syringobulbia may cause vertigo, nystagmus, unilateral or bilateral loss of facial sensation, lingual atrophy and weakness, dysarthria, dysphagia, hoarseness, and sometimes peripheral sensory or motor deficits due to medullary compression.

== Cause ==
A syrinx results when a watery, protective substance known as cerebrospinal fluid, that normally flows around the spinal cord and brain, transporting nutrients and waste products, collects in a small area of the spinal cord and forms a pseudocyst.

A number of medical conditions can cause an obstruction in the normal flow of cerebrospinal fluid, redirecting it into the spinal cord itself. For reasons that are only now becoming clear, this results in syrinx formation. Cerebrospinal fluid fills the syrinx. Pressure differences along the spine cause the fluid to move within the cyst. Physicians believe that it is this continual movement of fluid that results in cyst growth and further damage to the spinal cord.

In the case of syringomyelia, the syrinx can expand and elongate over time, destroying the spinal cord. Since the spinal cord connects the brain to nerves in the extremities, this damage may result in pain, weakness, and stiffness in the back, shoulders, arms, or legs. Other symptoms may include headaches and a loss of the ability to feel extremes of hot or cold, especially in the hands. Each patient experiences a different combination of symptoms. These symptoms typically vary depending on the extent and, often more critically, to the location of the syrinx within the spinal cord.

Syrinxes usually result from lesions that partially obstruct CSF flow. At least ½ of syrinxes occur in patients with congenital abnormalities of the craniocervical junction (e.g. herniation of cerebellar tissue into the spinal canal, called Chiari malformation), brain (e.g. encephalocele), or spinal cord (e.g. myelomeningocele—see Congenital Neurologic Anomalies: Brain Anomalies). For unknown reasons, these congenital abnormalities often expand during the teen or young adult years. A syrinx can also develop in patients who have a spinal cord tumor, scarring due to previous spinal trauma, or no known predisposing factors. About 30% of people with a spinal cord tumor eventually develop a syrinx.

Syringomyelia is a paramedian, usually irregular, longitudinal cavity. It most often affects the cervical and thoracic regions but may extend further down or up into the brainstem (syringobulbia). Syringobulbia, which is rare, usually occurs as a slitlike gap within the lower brain stem and may disrupt or compress the lower cranial nerves or ascending sensory or descending motor pathways.

== Diagnosis ==
A syrinx is suggested by an unexplained central cord syndrome or other characteristic neurologic deficits, particularly pain and temperature sensory deficits in a capelike distribution. MRI of the entire spinal cord and brain is done. Administration of intravenous Gadolinium during the MRI examination is useful for detecting any associated tumor.

== Treatment ==
Underlying problems (e.g. craniocervical junction abnormalities, postoperative scarring, spinal tumors) are corrected when possible. Surgical decompression of the foramen magnum and upper cervical cord is the only useful treatment, but surgery usually cannot reverse severe neurologic deterioration.

== Etymology ==
Syrinx is taken directly from the ancient Greek word for "tube." It is the root of the word "syringe."
