= Canine Chiari-like malformation =

Disease in dogs

Chiari-like malformation (CM) the most common cause of foramen magnum obstruction and syringomyelia in dogs. Syringomyelia (SM) is a disease of the spinal cord typified by fluid filled cavities, or syrinxes, within the spinal cord substance but it can cause pain by disrupting the cerebrospinal fluid (CSF), in the brain CM is a condition characterized by the mismatch of size between the brain and the skull. CM is very widespread in many Toy breed dogs and has been studied in the Cavalier King Charles Spaniel and the Griffon Bruxellois (Brussels Griffon) and Chihuahua. As many as 95% of Cavalier King Charles Spaniels may have CM. It is worldwide in scope and not limited to any country, breeding line, or kennel, and experts report that it is believed to be inherited CM is so widespread in the Cavalier that it may be an inherent part of the CKCS's breed standard.

This disease not only affects thousands of dogs, but a similar condition affects over three-hundred-thousand children yearly. Therefore, canines are an appropriate model for the treatment of the human condition.

== Symptoms ==
Clinical signs for CM include behavioural signs of pain vocalization, head scratching/rubbing, reduced activity, reduced stairs/jumping ability, spinal pain, altered emotional state (behavioural change to more timid, anxious or aggressive), sleep disturbance and touch aversion. Common symptoms in human patients include, severe headache and neck pain, dizziness, vertigo, disequilibrium, visual disturbances, ringing in the ears, difficulty swallowing, palpitations, sleep apnea, muscle weakness, impaired fine motor skills, chronic fatigue and painful tingling of the hands and feet, and pruritus.

== Diagnosis ==
Diagnosis of CM alone is challenging and identified by anatomical characteristics and ruling out other disorders. Whole spine Magnetic Resonance Imaging (MRI) may be used to evaluate the extent of syrinx formation (fluid filled cavity within the spinal cord) in CM dogs, developing a thermal camera-based screening test for the disorder and a method of measuring the actual syrinx volume from MR images.

Before the introduction of MRI, the diagnosis of CM and SM were commonly confused with that of allergic skin disorders, disk disease, ear infections and epilepsy. After CM was reported in human patients, the initial research was provided for the diagnosis of animals. MRI in animals is safe, however, to ensure that the patient remains motionless, light general anesthesia is required.

According to recent studies, thermography may be a useful tool in the diagnosis of CM and SM. Thermography requires no sedation or clipping of hair for a dog to be imaged by the infrared camera. After the image is captured, computer software is used to assess changes in the temperature and color pattern to detect abnormality.

== Treatment ==
The type of treatment needed for dogs diagnosed with CM/SM depends on the severity of the condition and the age of the dog. Young dogs with clinical signs should be considered for surgical removal to minimize the progression of the disease as the dog ages. Older dogs with little or no clinical signs may be treated medically, rather than surgically. However, severe cases of CM/SM may require surgery regardless of age. The goal of surgery is syrinx decompression through restoration of normal cerebrospinal fluid circulation.

The surgical treatment of CM in dogs is described as "foramen magnum decompression FMD". Despite an approximately 80% success rate with this surgical technique, there is a 25% to 50% relapse, primarily due to excessive scar tissue formation at the decompression site. A cranioplasty may be performed instead, in which a plate, constructed using titanium mesh and bone cement, is fixed to the back of the skull following a standard FMD procedure. The procedure had been effective in humans. The postoperative relapse rate associated with the titanium cranioplasty procedure is less than 7%.

== History ==
The name "Chiari-like" derives from one of the early scientists who diagnosed a similar structural condition in children, Dr. Hans Chiari.
