= Dissociated sensory loss =

- Specialty: Neurology

Dissociated sensory loss is a pattern of neurological damage caused by a lesion to a single tract in the spinal cord which involves preservation of fine touch and proprioception with selective loss of pain and temperature.

Understanding the mechanisms behind these selective lesions requires a brief discussion of the anatomy involved.

Loss of pain and temperature are due to damage to the lateral spinothalamic tracts, which cross the central part of the cord close to the level where they enter it and travel up the spinal column on the opposite side to the one they innervate (i.e. they ascend contralaterally). Note that a lesion of the lateral spinothalamic tract at a given level will not result in sensory loss for the dermatome of the same level; this is due to the fibers of the tract of Lissauer which transmit the neuron one or two levels above the affected segment (thus bypassing the segmental lesion on the contralateral side).

Loss of fine touch and proprioception are due to damage to the dorsal columns, which do not cross the cord until the brainstem, and so travel up the column on the same side to the one they innervate (i.e. they ascend ipsilaterally).

This means that a lesion of the dorsal columns will cause loss of touch and proprioception below the lesion and on the same side as it, while a lesion of the spinothalamic tracts will cause loss of pain and temperature below the lesion and on the opposite side to it.

Dissociated sensory loss always suggests a focal lesion within the spinal cord or brainstem.

The location of cord lesions affects presentation—for instance, a central lesion (such as that of syringomyelia) will knock out second order neurons of the spinothalamic tract as they cross the centre of the cord, and will cause loss of pain and temperature without loss of fine touch or proprioception.

Other causes of dissociated sensory loss include:

- Diabetes mellitus
- Syringomyelia
- Brown-Séquard syndrome
- Lateral medullary syndrome a.k.a. Wallenberg's syndrome
- Anterior spinal artery thrombosis
- Tangier disease
- Subacute combined degeneration
- Multiple sclerosis
- Tabes dorsalis
- Friedreich's ataxia (or other spinocerebellar degeneration)
- Traumatic and iatrogenic causes including acupuncture
