= Charles-Édouard Brown-Séquard =

Franco-Mauritian physiologist and neurologist

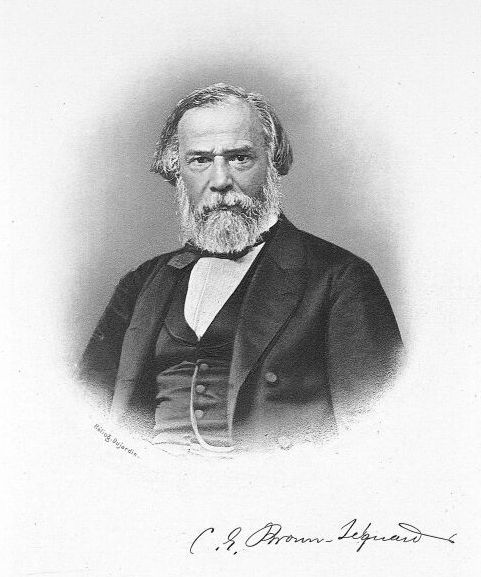
- Born: 8 April 1817; Port Louis, Mauritius
- Died: 2 April 1894 (aged 76); Sceaux, France
- Known for: Brown-Séquard syndrome
- Scientific career
- Fields: Medicine; Physiology; Neurology
- Workplaces: Virginia Commonwealth University

Charles-Édouard Brown-Séquard FRS (8 April 1817 – 2 April 1894) was a Franco-Mauritian physiologist and neurologist who, in 1850, became the first to describe what is now called Brown-Séquard syndrome.

== Early life ==
Brown-Séquard was born at Port Louis, Mauritius, to an American father and a French mother. He attended the Royal College in Mauritius, and graduated in medicine at Paris in 1846. He then returned to Mauritius with the intention of practising there, but in 1852 he went to the United States. There he was appointed to the faculty of the Medical College of Virginia where he conducted experiments in the basement of the Egyptian Building.

He was elected as a member of the American Philosophical Society in 1854.

== Later life ==
He returned to Paris, and in 1859 he migrated to London, becoming physician to the National Hospital for the Paralysed and Epileptic. There he stayed for about five years, expounding his views on the pathology of the nervous system in numerous lectures which attracted considerable attention. In 1864 he again crossed the Atlantic, and was appointed professor of physiology and neuropathology at Harvard. He relinquished this position in 1867, and in 1869 became professor at the École de Médecine in Paris, but in 1873 he again returned to America and began to practice in New York City. While in New York, his daughter, Charlotte Maria was born.

Finally, he went back to Paris to succeed Claude Bernard in 1878 as professor of experimental medicine in the Collège de France, and he remained there until his death, which occurred in 1894 at Sceaux, France. He was buried in Paris at the Cimetière du Montparnasse.

Brown-Séquard was quite a controversial and eccentric figure, and is also known for claiming, at age 72, rejuvenated sexual prowess after subcutaneous injection of extracts of animal testis. Thousands of men tried the therapy. The endocrinologist Robert B. Greenblatt wrote that this therapy could not have possibly worked because, unlike the thyroid gland, the testes do not store the hormones they produce and, therefore, obtaining a therapeutic dose of testosterone directly from animal glands "would require about one-quarter ton of bull's testes." It was later confirmed experimentally that his method did not yield active amounts of testosterone. The positive response by many men is now thought to have been a placebo effect, but apparently this was "sufficient to set the field of endocrinology off and running."

In 1886 Brown-Séquard was elected to the Board of the Sugar Club. He also was a member of the Royal Society of London.

== Works ==
Brown-Séquard was a keen observer and experimentalist. He contributed largely to our knowledge of the blood and animal heat, as well as many facts of the highest importance on the nervous system. He was the first scientist to work out the physiology of the spinal cord, demonstrating that the decussation of the fibres carrying pain and temperature sensation occurs in the cord itself. His name was immortalised in the history of medicine with the description of a syndrome which bears his name (Brown-Séquard syndrome) due to the hemisection of the spinal cord, which he described after observing accidental injury of the spinal cord in farmers cutting sugar cane in Mauritius.

Far more important is that he was one of the first to postulate the existence of substances, now known as hormones, secreted into the bloodstream to affect distant organs. In particular, he demonstrated (in 1856) that removal of the adrenal glands resulted in death, due to lack of essential hormones. At age 72, at a meeting of the Societé de Biologie in Paris, Brown-Séquard reported that hypodermic injection of a fluid prepared from the testicles of guinea pigs and dogs leads to rejuvenation and prolonged human life. It was known, among scientists, derisively, as the Brown-Séquard Elixir. A Vienna medical publication quipped dismissively: "The lecture must be seen as further proof of the necessity of retiring professors who have attained their threescore and ten years."

Brown-Séquard's research, published in about 500 essays and papers, especially in the Archives de Physiologie, which he helped to found in 1868 along with Jean-Martin Charcot and Alfred Vulpian, cover a very wide range of physiological and pathological subjects.

In the late 19th century Brown-Séquard gave rise to much controversy in the area of supposed inheritance of acquired characteristics. In a series of experiments on guinea pigs extending from 1869 to 1891, Brown-Séquard observed that a partial severing of the spinal cord, or a complete severing of the sciatic nerve, was followed after a few weeks by a peculiar morbid state resembling epilepsy. The offspring of the animals operated on were frequently decrepit, and a certain number showed a tendency to the so-called epilepsy. Some scientists considered these observations evidence for Lamarckian inheritance. However, Lamarck himself had rejected the inheritance of characteristics acquired by means other than their exercise or atrophy in response to environmental stimuli. His experiments are now considered anomalous; alternative explanations for his observations have been suggested. One proposed explanation was that the experiment showed a disease being induced in the parent and transmitted to the offspring.
