= Syringomyelia =

Disorder in which a cyst forms in the spinal cord

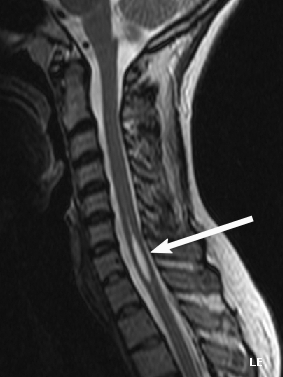
- Syrinx within the spinal cord
- Pronunciation: /sɪˌrɪŋɡəmaɪˈiːliə, -ɡoʊ-/
- Specialty: Neurology
- Symptoms: loss of sensitivity to pain and temperature
- Complications: Chronic pain, muscle weakness, paralysis
- Diagnostic method: MRI
- Treatment: Surgery, monitoring, pain management
- Frequency: 0.005%

Syringomyelia is a generic term referring to a disorder in which a cyst or cavity forms within the spinal cord. Often, syringomyelia is used as a generic term before an etiology is determined. This cyst, called a syrinx, can expand and elongate over time, damaging the spinal cord and its nerve fibers. The damage may result in loss of feeling, paralysis, weakness, and stiffness in the back, shoulders, and extremities.

Syringomyelia may also cause a loss of the ability to feel extremes of hot or cold, especially in the hands. It may also lead to a cape-like bilateral loss of pain and temperature sensation along the upper chest and arms. The combination of symptoms varies from one patient to another depending on the location of the syrinx within the spinal cord, as well as its extent.

Syringomyelia has a prevalence estimated at 8.4 cases per 100,000 people, with symptoms usually beginning in young adulthood. Signs of the disorder tend to develop slowly, although sudden onset may occur with coughing, straining, or myelopathy.

== Signs and symptoms ==
Syringomyelia causes a wide variety of neuropathic symptoms, due to damage to the spinal cord. Patients may experience severe chronic pain, abnormal sensations and loss of sensation, particularly in the hands. Some patients experience paralysis or paresis, temporarily or permanently. A syrinx may also cause disruptions in the parasympathetic and sympathetic nervous systems, leading to Horner syndrome, abnormal body temperature or sweating, bowel control issues, or other problems. If the syrinx is higher up in the spinal cord or affecting the brainstem, as in syringobulbia, vocal cord paralysis, ipsilateral tongue wasting, trigeminal nerve sensory loss, and other signs may be present. Rarely, bladder stones can occur at the onset of weakness in the lower extremities. Classically, syringomyelia spares the dorsal column/medial lemniscus of the spinal cord, leaving pressure, vibration, touch and proprioception intact in the upper extremities. Neuropathic arthropathy, also known as a Charcot joint, can occur, particularly in the shoulders, in patients with syringomyelia. The loss of sensory fibers to the joint is theorized to lead to degeneration of the joint over time.

== Cause ==
Generally, there are two forms of syringomyelia: congenital and acquired. Syringomyelia is generally a chronic disorder that occurs over time, resulting in muscular atrophy. Acquired Syringomyelia can be caused by a serious physical trauma to the body such as in a road traffic accident. Syringomyelia can also be classified into communicating and noncommunicating forms. Communicating typically occurs due to lesions on the foramen magnum and noncommunicating occurring due to other spinal cord diseases.

=== Congenital ===
The first major form relates to an abnormality of the brain called an Arnold–Chiari malformation or Chiari malformation. This is the most common cause of syringomyelia, where the anatomic abnormality, which may be due to a small posterior fossa, causes the lower part of the cerebellum to protrude from its normal location in the back of the head into the cervical or neck portion of the spinal canal. A syrinx may then develop in the cervical region of the spinal cord. Here, symptoms usually begin between the ages of 25 and 40 and may worsen with straining, called a valsalva maneuver, or any activity that causes cerebrospinal fluid pressure to fluctuate suddenly. Some patients, however, may have long periods of stability. Some patients with this form of the disorder also have hydrocephalus, in which cerebrospinal fluid accumulates in the skull, or a condition called arachnoiditis, in which a covering of the spinal cord—the arachnoid membrane—is inflamed. Some cases of syringomyelia are familial, although this is rare.

=== Acquired ===
The second major form of syringomyelia occurs as a complication of trauma, meningitis, hemorrhage, a tumor, or arachnoiditis. Here, the syrinx or cyst develops in a segment of the spinal cord damaged by one of these conditions. The syrinx then starts to expand. This is sometimes referred to as noncommunicating syringomyelia. Symptoms may appear months or even years after the initial injury, starting with pain, weakness, and sensory impairment originating at the site of trauma.

The primary symptom of post-traumatic syringomyelia (often referred to using the abbreviation of PTS) is pain, which may spread upward from the site of injury. Symptoms, such as pain, numbness, weakness, and disruption in temperature sensation, may be limited to one side of the body. Syringomyelia can also adversely affect sweating, sexual function, and, later, bladder and bowel control. A typical cause of PTS would be a car accident or similar trauma involving a whiplash injury.

What can make PTS difficult to diagnose is the fact that symptoms can often first appear long after the actual cause of the syrinx occurred (e.g., a car accident occurring and then the patient first experiencing PTS symptoms such as pain, loss of sensation, and reduced ability on the skin to feel varying degrees of hot and cold a number of months after the car accident).

== Pathogenesis ==
The pathogenesis of syringomyelia is debated. The cerebrospinal fluid also serves to cushion the brain. Excess cerebrospinal fluid in the central canal of the spinal cord is called hydromyelia. This term refers to increased cerebrospinal fluid that is contained within the ependyma of the central canal. When fluid dissects into the surrounding white matter forming a cystic cavity or syrinx, the term syringomyelia is applied. As these conditions coexist in the majority of cases, the term syringohydromyelia is applied. The terms are used interchangeably.

It has been observed that obstruction of the cerebrospinal fluid spaces in the subarachnoid space can result in syrinx formation, and alleviation of the obstruction may improve symptoms. A number of pathological conditions can cause an obstruction of the normal cerebrospinal fluid spaces. These include Chiari malformation, spinal arachnoiditis, scoliosis, spinal vertebrae misalignment, spinal tumors, spina bifida, and others. The reasons that blockage of the cerebrospinal fluid space within the subarachnoid space can result in syrinx formation are not fully understood although a small posterior fossa is one known cause. It is unclear if syrinx fluid originates from bulk movement of cerebrospinal fluid into the spinal cord, from bulk transmural movement of blood fluids through the spinal vasculature into the syrinx, or from a combination of both. Recent work suggests that central nervous system compliance is the underlying problem for the central nervous system, and also that hydrocephalus and syringomyelia have related causes.

== Diagnosis ==
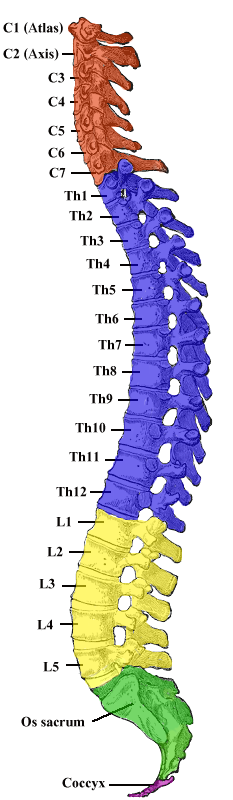

Physicians now use magnetic resonance imaging (MRI) to diagnose syringomyelia. The MRI radiographer takes images of body anatomy, such as the brain and spinal cord, in vivid detail. This test will show the syrinx in the spine or any other conditions, such as the presence of a tumor. MRI is safe, painless, and informative and has greatly improved the diagnosis of syringomyelia.

The physician may order additional tests to help confirm the diagnosis. One of these is called electromyography (EMG), which show possible lower motor neuron damage. Note this test isn't used diagnostically for injuries to the spine but to nerves and muscles. This would be part of a patient's rehab routine. In addition, computed axial tomography (CT) scans of a patient's head may reveal the presence of tumors and other abnormalities such as hydrocephalus.

Like MRI and CT scans, another test, called a myelogram, uses radiographs and requires a contrast medium to be injected into the subarachnoid space. Since the introduction of MRI, this test is rarely necessary to diagnose syringomyelia.

The possible causes are trauma, tumors, and congenital defects. It is most usually observed in the part of the spinal cord corresponding to the neck area. Symptoms are due to spinal cord damage and include pain, decreased sensation of touch, weakness, and loss of muscle tissue. The diagnosis is confirmed with a spinal CT, myelogram or MRI of the spinal cord. The cavity may be reduced by surgical decompression.

Furthermore, evidence also suggests that impact injuries to the thorax area highly correlate with the occurrence of a cervical-located syrinx.

== Treatment ==
=== Surgery ===
Treating syringomyelia sometimes requires surgery. Surgery involving the spinal cord carries certain risks, and as with any medical treatment, the potential benefits have to be weighed against the possible complications. On the other hand, delaying treatment can increase the risk of permanent damage. Evaluation of the condition is necessary because syringomyelia can remain stationary for long periods of time, and in some cases progress rapidly.

The main goal of surgical intervention is to correct the condition which led to the formation of the syrinx. Draining the syrinx can also help, by preventing it from becoming worse, but the symptoms the syrinx has already caused may not go away.

In cases involving an Arnold–Chiari malformation, the main goal of surgery is to provide more space for the cerebellum at the base of the skull and upper cervical spine, without entering the brain or spinal cord. This often causes the syrinx to shrink or disappear over time, as the normal flow of cerebrospinal fluid is restored. If syringomyelia is caused by a tumor, removing the tumor – if possible – is the treatment of choice.

Most patients' symptoms stabilize or have a modest improvement following surgery. Syringomyelia can come back, however, requiring additional surgeries which may be less effective.

In some cases, including both communicating and non-communicating forms of the condition, a syrinx may require ongoing drainage. This is done with a shunt, which uses tubes and valves to let cerebrospinal fluid (CSF) drain from the syrinx into another cavity within the body (usually the abdomen). This type of shunt, called a ventriculoperitoneal shunt, is particularly useful in cases involving hydrocephalus. By continually draining the syrinx, a shunt can arrest the progression of symptoms and relieve pain, headache, and tightness.

Many factors affect the decision to use a shunt. There are risks of injury to the spinal cord, infection, drainage becoming blocked, and bleeding, and they do not always achieve the intended results. Draining the fluid more quickly does not produce better outcomes, but for some syrinxes, a shunt is the only drainage option.

In the case of trauma-related syringomyelia, the surgeon operates at the level of the initial injury. The syrinx collapses at surgery, but a tube or shunt is usually necessary to prevent it from returning.

=== Non-surgical interventions ===
Surgery is not always recommended for syringomyelia patients. While there is no medication which can cure the condition, for many patients, the main treatment is analgesia to manage the symptoms. Physicians specializing in pain management can develop a medication and treatment plan to ameliorate pain. Medications to combat any neuropathic pain symptoms such as shooting and stabbing pains (e.g. gabapentin or pregabalin) would be first-line choices. Opiates are usually prescribed for pain for management of this condition. Conversely, facet joint injections are not indicated for the treatment of syringomyelia.

Radiation is rare, but may be used if a tumor is involved. In these cases, it can halt the extension of a cavity and may help to alleviate pain.

Treatment is usually reserved for cases which are causing symptoms. Treatment may not provide enough benefits to be recommended for elderly patients, or when symptoms are stable instead of worsening. Whether treated or not, many patients are advised to avoid activities that involve straining.

A conservative approach may be recommended, as the natural history of syringomyelia is not yet well understood. When surgery is not currently advised, patients are monitored with regular physical evaluations and MRI's.

== Research ==

The precise causes of syringomyelia are still unknown, although blockage of the flow of cerebrospinal fluid has been known to be an important factor since the 1970s. Scientists in the UK and US continue to explore the mechanisms that lead to the formation of syrinxes in the spinal cord. It has been demonstrated that a block of the free flow of cerebrospinal fluid is a contributing factor in the pathogenesis of the disease. Duke University in America and Warwick University are conducting research to explore genetic features of syringomyelia.

Surgical techniques are also being refined by the neurosurgical research community. Successful procedures expand the area around the cerebellum and spinal cord, improving the flow of cerebrospinal fluid and thereby reducing the syrinx.

It is also important to understand the role of birth defects in the development of hindbrain malformations that can lead to syringomyelia, as syringomyelia is a feature of intrauterine life and is also associated with spina bifida. Learning when these defects occur during the development of the fetus can help with the understanding of this and similar disorders, and may lead to preventive treatment that can stop the formation of some birth abnormalities.

Diagnostic technology is another area for continued research. MRI has enabled scientists to see the situation within the spine, including syringomyelia, before any symptoms appear. A new technology, known as dynamic MRI, allows investigators to view spinal fluid flow within the syrinx. CT scans allow physicians to see abnormalities in the brain, and other diagnostic tests have also improved greatly with the availability of new, non-toxic, contrast dyes.

== See also ==
- Brown-Séquard syndrome
- Central cord syndrome
- Dissociated sensory loss
- Ependymoma, a type of tumors that are capable of causing syringomyelia
- Otto Kahler, a neurologist in the late 1800s who published the first complete description of syringomyelia.
- Peter McFarline, Australian sports writer who had syringomyelia
- Scoliosis is sometimes caused by syringomyelia.
- Canine Chiari-like malformation
- Syringobulbia
- Ehlers–Danlos syndrome
- Hypermobility spectrum disorder
