= Hematomyelia =

Bleeding of spinal cord

Hematomyelia (formally, Intramedullary spinal cord hemorrhage, also called Intraspinal hemorrhage) is the bleeding of spinal cord. Its presence indicates a spinal cord injury, and it is one of the causes of myelopathy, as a result of the compression and destruction of the spinal cord. Unlike spinal cord contusion (spinal cord edema), which usually regresses over 1-2 weeks, whose prognosis is generally good for neurologic recovery, a hematomyelia greater than 10 mm in diameter indicates a complete neurologic injury.
