= Brown-Séquard syndrome =

Human spinal cord disorder

- Other names: Brown-Séquard's paralysis
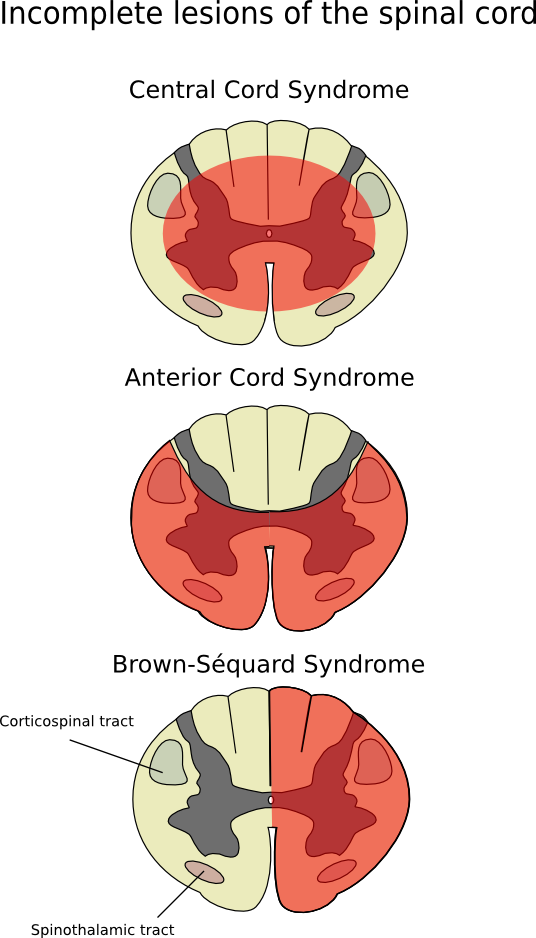
- Specialty: Neurology

Brown-Séquard syndrome (also known as Brown-Séquard's hemiplegia, Brown-Séquard's paralysis, hemiparaplegic syndrome, hemiplegia et hemiparaplegia spinalis, or spinal hemiparaplegia) is a neurological condition caused by damage to one half of the spinal cord. The condition presents clinically with spastic paralysis and loss of fine touch perception, vibratory sensation and proprioception just below the lesion on the same side of the body as the lesion, but with loss of crude touch, pain and temperature sensation on the opposite side and beginning somewhat lower than the lesion. At the level of the lesion, on the same side of the lesion, there is meanwhile a region of flaccid paralysis and complete loss of all sensation.

Because injury to a whole half but only one half of the spinal cord only rarely occurs under real-life circumstances, the condition is most often encountered in partial forms.

It is named after physiologist Charles-Édouard Brown-Séquard, who first described the condition in 1850.

== Presentation and pathophysiology ==
The syndrome is frequently encountered in clinical practice, but only rarely presents in its classical form because most lesions are irregular; partial hemisection is common, but complete hemisection is rare. The development of characteristic pathology is preceded by a period of spinal shock.

=== Neuroanatomy ===

The hemisection of the spinal cord produces the classical triad characterising this syndrome by disrupting the following three structures of the spinal cord:

- Corticospinal tract - the "pyramidal" tract containing upper motor neurons mediates voluntary movements of skeletal muscle. It consists of two subdivisions: the lateral corticospinal tract which is situated in the lateral funiculus, controls musculature associated with the limbs and does not decussate within the spinal cord; and the anterior corticospinal tract which is situated in the anterior funiculus, controls the musculature of the trunk and does decussate within the spinal cord.
- Posterior funiculus - posterior anatomical division of the white matter of the spinal cord exclusively containing axons of 1st-order neurons of the dorsal column–medial lemniscus pathway which conveys sensory stimuli regarding fine (discriminative) touch, proprioception, and vibratory sense from the trunk and limbs. These do not decussate within the spinal cord.
- Spinothalamic tract - consists of two subdivisions: the lateral spinothalamic tract which is situated within the lateral funiculus and conveys sensory stimuli regarding pain, temperature, and pressure; and the anterior spinothalamic tract which is situated within the anterior funiculus and conveys sensory stimuli concerning crude (non-discriminative) touch and pressure information. Both tracts decussate within the spinal cord.

=== Motor ===
Lesion on the patient's right: 1. loss of all sensation, hypotonic paralysis; 2. spastic paralysis and loss of vibration and proprioception (position sense) and fine touch; 3. loss of pain and temperature sensation

At the level of the lesion, destruction of the anterior gray column and potentially also of the anterior (motor) root of the corresponding spinal nerve results in destruction of lower motor neurons of the spinal segment on the affected side, causing flaccid paralysis and consequent muscle atrophy of the corresponding myotome.

Disruption of the upper motor neuron corticospinal tract produces ipsilateral spastic paralysis below the level of the lesion. Spasticity is a consequence of disruption of ipsilateral extrapiramidal tracts.

==== Reflexes ====
BSS is associated with ipsilateral Babinski sign and possibly (depending upon the level of the lesion) with loss of ipsilateral cremasteric reflex, and abdominal reflex.

=== Sensory ===
At the level of the lesion, destruction of the posterior (sensory) root of the corresponding spinal nerve causes complete loss of sensation (anaesthesia) of the corresponding dermatome.

Disruption of the dorsal column pathway causes ipsilateral loss of fine (discriminative) touch, vibration, and proprioceptive perception.

Disruption of the spinothalamic tract causes contralateral loss of pain, temperature, and crude (non-discriminative) touch sensation loss starting from 2-3 spinal cord segments inferior to the level of the lesion (because 2nd-order axons of the spinothalamic tract decussate obliquely).

== Causes ==
Brown-Séquard syndrome may be caused by trauma (either blunt trauma or penetrative injury), spinal cord tumors, syringomyelia, hematomyelia, ischemia (obstruction of a blood vessel), infection (e.g. spinal tuberculosis, human herpesvirus 3) or autoimmune disease (e.g. multiple sclerosis). The most common cause is penetrating trauma such as gunshot injury or a stab wound to the spinal cord.

== History ==
Charles-Édouard Brown-Séquard studied the anatomy and physiology of the spinal cord. He described this injury after observing spinal cord trauma which happened to farmers while cutting sugar cane in Mauritius. French physician, Paul Loye, attempted to confirm Brown-Séquard's observations on the nervous system by experimentation with decapitation of dogs and other animals and recording the extent of each animal's movement after decapitation.

== Sources ==
- Egido Herrero JA, Saldanã C, Jiménez A, Vázquez A, Varela de Seijas E, Mata P (1992). "Spontaneous cervical epidural hematoma with Brown-Séquard syndrome and spontaneous resolution. Case report". J Neurosurg Sci. 36 (2): 117–19. PMID 1469473.
- Ellger T, Schul C, Heindel W, Evers S, Ringelstein EB (June 2006). "Idiopathic spinal cord herniation causing progressive Brown-Séquard syndrome". Clin Neurol Neurosurg. 108 (4): 388–91. doi:10.1016/j.clineuro.2004.07.005. PMID 16483712. S2CID 35644328.
- Finelli PF, Leopold N, Tarras S (May 1992). "Brown-Sequard syndrome and herniated cervical disc". Spine. 17 (5): 598–600. doi:10.1097/00007632-199205000-00022. PMID 1621163. S2CID 37493662.
- Hancock JB, Field EM, Gadam R (1997). "Spinal epidural hematoma progressing to Brown-Sequard syndrome: report of a case". J Emerg Med. 15 (3): 309–12. doi:10.1016/S0736-4679(97)00010-3. PMID 9258779.
- Harris P (November 2005). "Stab wound of the back causing an acute subdural haematoma and a Brown-Sequard neurological syndrome". Spinal Cord. 43 (11): 678–9. doi:10.1038/sj.sc.3101765. PMID 15852056.
- Henderson SO, Hoffner RJ (1998). "Brown-Sequard syndrome due to isolated blunt trauma". J Emerg Med. 16 (6): 847–50. doi:10.1016/S0736-4679(98)00096-1. PMID 9848698.
- Hwang W, Ralph J, Marco E, Hemphill JC (June 2003). "Incomplete Brown-Séquard syndrome after methamphetamine injection into the neck". Neurology. 60 (12): 2015–16. doi:10.1212/01.wnl.0000068014.89207.99. PMID 12821761. S2CID 13491137.
- Kraus JA, Stüper BK, Berlit P (1998). "Multiple sclerosis presenting with a Brown-Séquard syndrome". J. Neurol. Sci. 156 (1): 112–13. doi:10.1016/S0022-510X(98)00016-1. PMID 9559998. S2CID 44403915.
- Lim E, Wong YS, Lo YL, Lim SH (April 2003). "Traumatic atypical Brown-Sequard syndrome: case report and literature review". Clin Neurol Neurosurg. 105 (2): 143–45. doi:10.1016/S0303-8467(03)00009-X. PMID 12691810. S2CID 37419566.
- Lipper MH, Goldstein JH, Do HM (August 1998). "Brown-Séquard syndrome of the cervical spinal cord after chiropractic manipulation". AJNR Am J Neuroradiol. 19 (7): 1349–52. PMC 8332220. PMID 9726481.
- Mastronardi L, Ruggeri A (January 2004). "Cervical disc herniation producing Brown-Sequard syndrome: case report". Spine. 29 (2): E28–31. doi:10.1097/01.BRS.0000105984.62308.F6. PMID 14722422. S2CID 36231998.
- Miyake S, Tamaki N, Nagashima T, Kurata H, Eguchi T, Kimura H (February 1998). "Idiopathic spinal cord herniation. Report of two cases and review of the literature". J. Neurosurg. 88 (2): 331–35. doi:10.3171/jns.1998.88.2.0331. PMID 9452246.
- Rumana CS, Baskin DS (April 1996). "Brown-Sequard syndrome produced by cervical disc herniation: case report and literature review". Surg Neurol. 45 (4): 359–61. doi:10.1016/0090-3019(95)00412-2. PMID 8607086.
- Stephen AB, Stevens K, Craigen MA, Kerslake RW (October 1997). "Brown-Séquard syndrome due to traumatic brachial plexus root avulsion". Injury. 28 (8): 557–58. doi:10.1016/S0020-1383(97)83474-2. PMID 9616398.
