= Spastic diplegia =

Form of cerebral palsy affecting the lower body muscles

- Other names: Little's disease
- Specialty: Neurology

Spastic diplegia is a form of cerebral palsy (CP) that primarily affects the legs, with possible considerable asymmetry between the two sides. It is a chronic neuromuscular condition of hypertonia and spasticity in the muscles of the lower extremities of the human body, manifested as an especially high and constant "tightness" or "stiffness", usually in the legs, hips and pelvis.

As its name suggests, spasticity is a particularly prominent element of this condition. The tension in the spastic muscles during development often leads to bony deformities, especially torsion, or twisting, of the femur (femoral anteversion) and the tibia (external tibial torsion).

Doctor William John Little's first recorded encounter with cerebral palsy is reported to have been among children who displayed signs of spastic diplegia.

== Presentation ==
Individuals with spastic diplegia are often very tight and stiff and must work very hard to successfully resist and "push through" the extra tightness they experience. Other than this, these individuals are almost always normal in every significant clinical sense. When they are younger, spastic diplegic individuals typically undergo gait analysis so that their clinicians can determine the best assistive devices for them, if any are necessary, such as a walker or crutches. The main difference between spastic diplegia and a normal gait pattern is its signature "scissor gait" - a style that people who lack the relevant experience may sometimes confuse with the effects of drunkenness, multiple sclerosis, or another nerve disease. The degree of spasticity in spastic diplegia (and, for that matter, other types of spastic CP) varies widely from person to person. No two people with spastic diplegia are exactly alike. Balance problems and/or stiffness in gait can range from barely noticeable all the way to misalignments so pronounced that the person needs crutches (typically forearm crutches) or a walking stick to assist in ambulation.

Less often, spasticity is severe enough to compel the person to use a wheelchair. In general, however, lower-extremity spasticity in spastic diplegia is rarely so great as to totally prevent ambulation–most people with the condition can walk and can do so with at least a basic amount of overall stability. Regardless, from case to case, steeply varying degrees of imbalance, potential tripping over uneven terrain while walking, or needing to hold on to various surfaces or walls in certain circumstances to keep upright, are typically ever-present potential issues and are much more common occurrences amongst those with spastic diplegia than among those with a normal or near-normal gait pattern.

Among some of the people with spastic diplegia who choose to be ambulatory on either an exclusive or predominant basis, one of the seemingly common lifestyle choices is for the person to ambulate within his or her home without an assistive device, and then to use the assistive device, if any, once outdoors. Others may use no assistive device in any indoor situation at all, while always using one when outdoors. Above the hips, persons with spastic diplegia typically retain normal or near-normal muscle tone and range of motion, though some lesser spasticity may also affect the upper body, such as the trunk and arms, depending on the severity of the condition in the individual (the spasticity condition affecting the whole body equally, rather than just the legs, is spastic quadriplegia, a slightly different classification). In addition, because leg tightness often leads to instability in ambulation, extra muscle tension usually develops in the shoulders, chest, and arms due to compensatory stabilization movements, regardless of the fact that the upper body itself is not directly affected by the condition.

=== Social implications ===
Although the term "spastic" technically describes the attribute of spasticity in spastic cerebral palsy and was originally an acceptable and common term to use in both self-description and in description by others, it has since gained more notoriety as a pejorative, in particular when used in pop culture to insult non-disabled people when they seem overly anxious or unskilled in sports (see also the article Spastic (word)). In 1952, a UK charitable organization with a membership mainly of those with spastic CP was formed; this organization called itself The Spastics Society. However, the charity changed its name to Scope in 1994 due to the term spastics having become enough of a pejorative to warrant the name change.

Spastic diplegia's social implications tend to vary with the intensity of the individual’s condition. If its effects are severely disabling, social elements can also suffer. Workplace environments can also be limited, since most labor-intensive work requires basic physical agility that spastic diplegics may not possess. However, the degree of variability among individuals with spastic diplegia means that no greater or lesser degree of stigma or real-world limitation is standard. Lesser effects usually mean fewer physical limitations, better-quality exercise, and more real-world flexibility.

== Mechanism ==
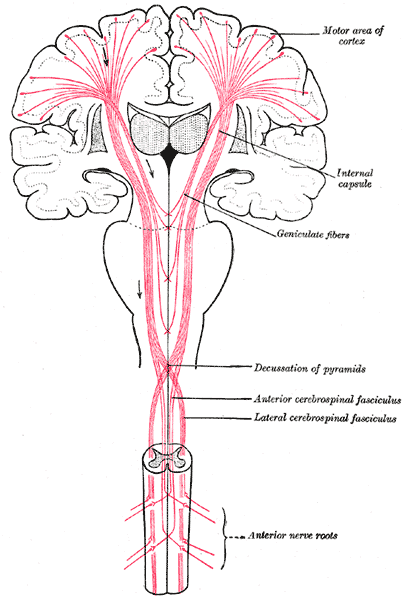
Motor track

Spastic diplegia is a particular type of brain damage that inhibits the proper development of upper motor neuron function, impacting the motor cortex, the basal ganglia and the corticospinal tract. Nerve receptors in the spine leading to affected muscles become unable to properly absorb gamma amino butyric acid (GABA), the amino acid that regulates muscle tone in humans. Without GABA absorption to those particular nerve rootlets (usually centered, in this case, around the sectors L1-S1 and L2-S2), affected nerves (here, the ones controlling the legs) perpetually fire the message for their corresponding muscles to permanently, rigidly contract, and the muscles become permanently hypertonic (spastic).

The abnormally high muscle tone that results creates lifelong difficulty with all voluntary and passive movement in the legs, and in general creates stress over time, depending on the severity of the condition in the individual, the constant spasticity ultimately produces pain, muscle/joint breakdown including tendinitis and arthritis, premature physical exhaustion (i.e., becoming physically exhausted even when you internally know that you have more energy than you are able to use), contractures, spasms, and progressively worse deformities/mis-alignments of bone structure around areas of the tightened musculature as the person's years progress. Severe arthritis, tendinitis, and similar breakdown can start as early as the spastic diplegic person's mid-20s (as a comparison, typical people with normal muscle tone are not at risk of arthritis, tendinitis, and similar breakdown until well into their 50s or 60s, if even then).

No type of CP is officially a progressive condition, and indeed spastic diplegia does not clinically "get worse" given the nerves, damaged permanently at birth, neither recover nor degrade. This aspect is clinically significant, because other neuromuscular conditions with similar surface characteristics in their presentations, like most forms of multiple sclerosis, indeed do degrade the body over time and do involve actual progressive worsening of the condition, including the spasticity often seen in MS. However, spastic diplegia is indeed a chronic condition; the symptoms themselves cause compounded effects on the body that are typically just as stressful on the human body as a progressive condition is. Despite this reality and the fact that muscle tightness is the symptom of spastic diplegia and not the cause, symptoms rather than cause are typically seen as the primary area of focus for treatment, especially surgical treatment, except when a selective dorsal rhizotomy is brought into consideration, or when an oral baclofen regimen is attempted.

Unlike any other condition that may present with similar effects, spastic diplegia is entirely congenital in origin - that is, it is almost always acquired shortly before or during a baby's birth process. Things like exposure to toxins, traumatic brain injury, encephalitis, meningitis, drowning, or suffocation do not tend to lead to spastic diplegia in particular or even cerebral palsy generally. Overall, the most common cause of spastic diplegia is Periventricular leukomalacia, more commonly known as neonatal asphyxia or infant hypoxia—a sudden in-womb shortage of oxygen-delivery through the umbilical cord. This sudden lack of oxygen is also almost always combined with premature birth, a phenomenon that, even by itself, would inherently risk the infant developing some type of CP. On the other hand, the presence of certain maternal infections during pregnancy such as congenital rubella syndrome can also lead to spastic diplegia, since such infections can have similar end results to infant hypoxia.

== Treatment ==
As a matter of everyday maintenance, muscle stretching, range of motion exercises, yoga, contact improvisation, modern dance, resistance training, and other physical activity regimens are often utilized by those with spastic CP to help prevent contractures and reduce the severity of symptoms.

Baclofen

Major clinical treatments for spastic diplegia are:

- Baclofen (and its derivatives), a gamma amino butyric acid (GABA) substitute in oral (pill-based) or intrathecal form. Baclofen is essentially chemically identical to the GABA that the damaged, over-firing nerves cannot absorb, except that it has an extra chemical 'marker' on it that makes the damaged nerves 'think' it is a different compound, and thus those nerves will absorb it. Baclofen is noted for being the sole medication available for GABA-deficiency-based spasticity which acts on the actual cause of the spasticity rather than simply reducing symptomatology as muscle relaxants and painkillers do. The intrathecal solution is a liquid injected into the spinal fluid for trial, and if successful in reducing spasticity, thereafter administered via an intrathecal pump, which has variously been proven potentially very dangerous on one or another level with long-term use (see article), including sudden and potentially lethal baclofen overdose, whereas the oral route, which comes in 10- or 20-milligram tablets and the dosage of which can be gently titrated either upward or downward, as well as safely ceased entirely, has not.
- Antispasmodic muscle relaxant chemicals such as tizanidine and botulinum toxin (Botox), injected directly into the spastic muscles; Botox wears off every three months.
- Phenol and similar chemical 'nerve deadeners', injected selectively into the over-firing nerves in the legs on the muscle end to reduce spasticity in their corresponding muscles by preventing the spasticity signals from reaching the legs; Phenol wears off every six months.
- Orthopedic surgery to release the spastic muscles from their hypertonic state, a usually temporary result because the spasticity source is the nerves, not the muscles; spasticity can fully reassert itself as little as one-year post-surgery.
- Selective dorsal rhizotomy, a neurosurgery directly targeting and eliminating ("cutting" or "lesioning") the over-firing nerve rootlets and leaving the properly firing ones intact, thereby permanently eliminating the spasticity but compelling the person to spend months re-strengthening muscles that will have been severely weakened by the loss of the spasticity, due to the fact of those muscles not really having had actual strength to begin with.

== Prognosis ==
Unusually, cerebral palsy, including spastic cerebral palsy, is notable for a glaring overall research deficiency - the fact that it is one of the very few major groups of conditions on the planet in human beings for which medical science has not yet (as of 2011) collected wide-ranging empirical data on the development and experiences of young adults, the middle aged and older adults. An especially puzzling aspect of this lies in the fact that cerebral palsy as defined by modern science was first 'discovered' and specifically addressed well over 100 years ago and that it would therefore be reasonable to expect by now that at least some empirical data on the adult populations with these conditions would have long since been collected, especially over the second half of the 20th century when existing treatment technologies rapidly improved and new ones came into being. The vast majority of empirical data on the various forms of cerebral palsy is concerned near-exclusively with children (birth to about 10 years of age) and sometimes pre-teens and early teens (11-13). Some doctors attempt to provide their own personal justifications for keeping their CP specialties purely pediatric, but there is no objectively apparent set of reasons backed by any scientific consensus as to why medical science has made a point of researching adult cases of multiple sclerosis, muscular dystrophy and the various forms of cancer in young and older adults, but has failed to do so with CP. There are a few orthopaedic surgeons and neurosurgeons who claim to be gathering pace with various studies as of the past few years, but these claims do not yet seem to have been matched by real-world actualization in terms of easily accessible and objectively verifiable resources available to the general public on the internet and in-person, where many, including medical-science researchers and doctors themselves, would more than likely agree such resources would ideally belong.

== Prevalence ==
In the industrialized world, the incidence of overall cerebral palsy, which includes but is not limited to spastic diplegia, is about 2 per 1000 live births. Thus far, there is no known study recording the incidence of CP in the overall non-industrialized world. Therefore, it is safe to assume that not all spastic CP individuals are known to science and medicine, especially in areas of the world where healthcare systems are less advanced. Many such individuals may simply live out their lives in their local communities without any medical or orthopedic oversight at all, or with extremely minimal such treatment, so that they are never able to be incorporated into any empirical data that orthopedic surgeons or neurosurgeons might seek to collect. It is shocking to note that - as with people with physical disability overall - some may even find themselves in situations of institutionalization, and thus barely see the outside world at all.

From what is known, the incidence of spastic diplegia is higher in males than in females; the Surveillance of Cerebral Palsy in Europe (SCPE), for example, reports a M:F ratio of 1.33:1. Variances in reported rates of incidence across different geographical areas in industrialized countries are thought to be caused primarily by discrepancies in the criteria used for inclusion and exclusion.

When such discrepancies are taken into account in comparing two or more registers of patients with cerebral palsy and also the extent to which children with mild cerebral palsy are included, the incidence rates still converge toward the average rate of 2:1000.

In the United States, approximately 10,000 infants and babies are born with CP each year, and 1200–1500 are diagnosed at preschool age when symptoms become more obvious. Those with extremely mild spastic CP may not even be aware of their condition until much later in life: Internet chat forums have recorded men and women as old as 30 who were diagnosed only recently with their spastic CP.

Overall, advances in care of pregnant mothers and their babies have not resulted in a noticeable decrease in CP; in fact, because medical advances in areas related to the care of premature babies have resulted in a greater survival rate in recent years, it is actually more likely for infants with cerebral palsy to be born into the world now than it would have been in the past. Only the introduction of quality medical care to locations with less-than-adequate medical care has shown any decreases in the incidences of CP; the rest have either shown no change or have shown an increase. The incidence of CP increases with premature or very low-weight babies regardless of the quality of care.

== See also ==
- Inclusion (disability rights)
- Cerebral palsy
- Spasticity
- Gamma amino butyric acid
- Rhizotomy
- Tizanidine
