= Lower motor neuron lesion =

- Lower motor neuron in red

A lower motor neuron lesion is a lesion which affects nerve fibers traveling from the lower motor neuron(s) in the anterior horn/anterior grey column of the spinal cord, or in the motor nuclei of the cranial nerves, to the relevant muscle(s).

One major characteristic used to identify a lower motor neuron lesion is flaccid paralysis – paralysis accompanied by loss of muscle tone. This is in contrast to an upper motor neuron lesion, which often presents with spastic paralysis – paralysis accompanied by severe hypertonia.

== Signs and symptoms ==
- Muscle paresis or paralysis
- Fibrillations
- Fasciculations – caused by increased receptor concentration on muscles to compensate for lack of innervation.
- Hypotonia or atonia – Tone is not velocity dependent.
- Hyporeflexia - Along with deep reflexes even cutaneous reflexes are also decreased or absent.
- Strength – weakness is limited to segmental or focal pattern, Root innervated pattern

The extensor plantar reflex (Babinski sign) is usually absent. Muscle paresis/paralysis, hypotonia/atonia, and hyporeflexia/areflexia are usually seen immediately following an insult. Muscle wasting, fasciculations and fibrillations are typically signs of end-stage muscle denervation and are seen over a longer time period. Another feature is the segmentation of symptoms – only muscles innervated by the damaged nerves will be symptomatic.

== Causes ==
The most common causes of lower motor neuron injuries are trauma to peripheral nerves that serve the axons, and viruses that selectively attack ventral horn cells. Disuse atrophy of the muscle occurs i.e., shrinkage of muscle fibre finally replaced by fibrous tissue (fibrous muscle) Other causes include Guillain–Barré syndrome, West Nile fever, Clostridium botulinum, polio, and cauda equina syndrome; another common cause of lower motor neuron degeneration is amyotrophic lateral sclerosis.

== Diagnosis ==
=== Differential diagnosis ===
- Myasthenia gravis – synaptic transmission at motor end-plate is impaired
- Amyotrophic lateral sclerosis – causes death of motor neurons, although exact cause is unknown it has been suggested that abnormal build-up of proteins proves toxic for the neurons.

== See also ==
- Lower motor neuron
- Upper motor neuron
- Upper motor neuron lesion
