= Upper motor neuron syndrome =

Motor-control abnormalities resulting from an upper motor neuron lesion

Upper motor neuron syndrome (UMNS) is a set of motor control abnormalities that occur after damage or lesions to descending motor pathways of upper motor neurons in the central nervous system. UMNS is characterized by impaired voluntary muscle control and changes in muscle tone and stretch reflexes. Conditions that may exhibit UMNS include stroke, traumatic brain injury (TBI), spinal cord injury (SCI), multiple sclerosis (MS), and cerebral palsy.

Clinical manifestations of UMNS are commonly classified into positive and negative signs. Positive signs include hyperreflexia, spasticity, involuntary muscle spasms, and clonus. Negative signs include reduced dexterity, muscle weakness, and impaired muscle control. Over time, secondary changes such as joint contractures and muscle shortening may occur.

Spasticity is a possible symptom of UMNS, although the terms are incorrectly used interchangeably. Management addresses functional limitations, abnormal muscle activity, and secondary complications associated with the underlying neurological condition that is precipitating UMNS.

== Signs and symptoms ==
The location and extent of the neurological lesion determine how UMNS manifests clinically. Manifestations include positive and negative signs, which could lead to secondary changes affecting muscles and connective tissues.

=== Positive signs ===
Positive signs are defined as increased or involuntary muscle activity and exaggerated stretch reflexes. The widely accepted definition of spasticity is a velocity-dependent increase in muscle tone or resistance to passive muscle stretch, which is associated with abnormal stretch reflexes. Another sign is clonus, which consists of repetitive, involuntary muscle contractions that are elicited by sustained muscle stretch, usually seen at the ankle. Hyperreflexia is characterized by exaggerated deep tendon reflexes (DTR), and involuntary muscle spasms or irregular muscle activation may occur.

=== Negative signs ===
Negative signs are characterized by reduced voluntary motor function, including muscle weakness, impaired dexterity, and reduced selective motor control ability. These manifestations may make coordinated movements such as reaching, grasping, walking, or sitting up more difficult. This can lead to issues involving activities of daily living, mobility, and posture.

Category	Clinical Manifestation	Description
Positive Signs	Spasticity	Velocity-dependent increase in tone/resistance to passive muscle stretch/movement
	Hyperreflexia	Exaggerated deep tendon reflexes
	Clonus	Repetitive, involuntary muscle contractions
	Muscle Spasms	Uncontrolled muscle contractions
Negative Signs	Muscle Weakness	Reduced voluntary force generation by muscles
	Impaired Dexterity	Difficulty executing precise movements
	Reduced Selective Motor Control	Difficulty activating muscles/muscle groups independently
Secondary Musculoskeletal Changes	Muscle Shortening	Reduced muscle length
	Joint Contracture	Persistent restriction of joint range of motion due to changes in soft tissue
	Increased Passive Stiffness	Resistance to movement due to tissue changes

== Causes ==
Upper motor neuron syndrome is seen in conditions where descending motor pathways within the brain or spinal cord are injured. These include spinal cord injury, cerebral palsy, multiple sclerosis and acquired brain injury including stroke. These conditions may affect different neural pathways involved in movement, posture, and spinal reflexes.

== Pathophysiology ==
Development of UMNS is brought on by the disruption of descending pathways that control spinal motor units. Normally, excitatory and inhibitory signals are sent along these pathways to influence spinal motor neurons and interneurons. When these pathways are damaged, voluntary muscle recruitment is altered due to impaired activity of spinal reflex circuits. This reduced motor unit recruitment can lead to impaired coordination and contributes to possible weakness.

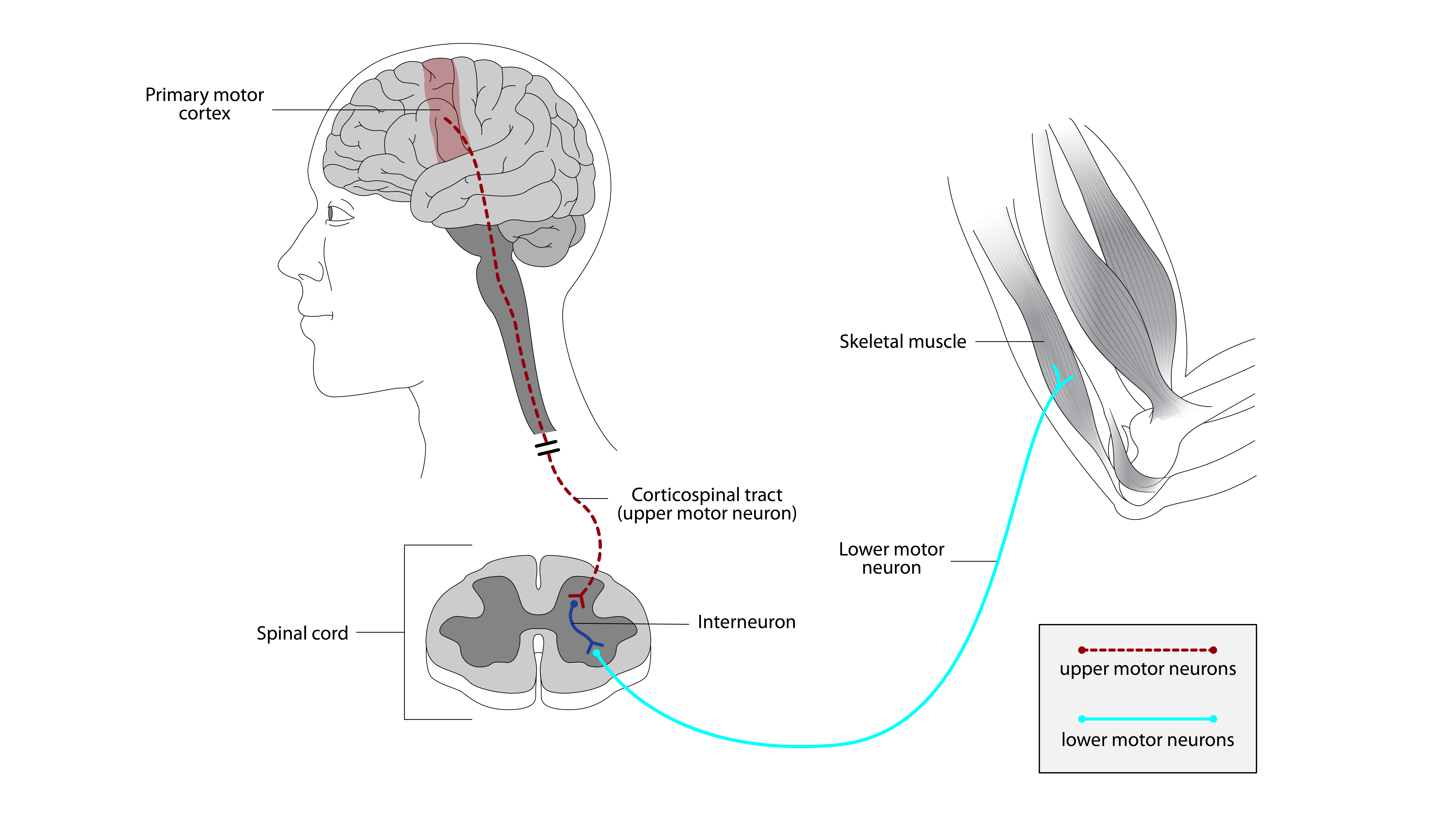
Schematic representation of corticospinal pathway and the connections with spinal interneurons, lower motor neurons, and skeletal muscle.

Spinal reflex pathways are commonly altered due to changes in the descending input from the spinal cord. The lack of a consistent relationship between inhibitory and excitatory signals in the spinal neural network contribute to excessive muscle responses to movement or stretches. For example, if the pathways sending inhibitory signals is damaged, the muscle fibers will continuously receive excitatory input, causing unopposed muscle contraction.

Following acute spinal cord injury, a phenomenon coined spinal shock may occur, which presents with reduced muscle town and diminished or absent deep tendon reflexes below the level of the injury. As time passes, spinal reflex activity returns, leading to hyperactive reflexes and possibly spasticity.

After injury, reduced movement and immobilization of a muscle in the shortened position can lead to fibrotic changes in muscle fibers and connective tissue after a prolonged period of time. These changes increase resistance to passive stretching independent of irregular reflexes. Stiffness of muscles encounter during examination can thus be explained by neural and non-neural mechanisms.

== Diagnosis ==
UMNS is identified through physical examination in the context of a condition affecting the central nervous system. Assessment of symptoms include examination of strength through manual muscle testing, deep tendon reflexes, coordination, muscle tone, voluntary muscle control, and joint range of motion. An important portion of this assessment also considers how these symptoms can affect acts of daily living, mobility, positioning, and pain.

=== Assessment of spasticity ===
The Modified Ashworth Scale is a grading system used to scale resistance during passive movement at a particular joint. This scale, however, cannot reliably differentiate resistance caused by involuntary muscle activity from changes in muscle and connective tissues. The Modified Tardieu Scale is another scale that can be used to assess spasticity. This scale assesses the response to passive stretching at different velocities, which may help specify the velocity-dependent component of muscle hyperactivity.

=== Functional assessment ===
Assessing a patient's function may require input from many different specialists. These specialists may include physicians, physical therapists, occupational therapists, and other professionals if indicated.

== Treatment ==
Treatment of UMNS is individualized according to the underlying neurological condition, motor impairments, and specific functional needs of the patient. Interventions may address impaired voluntary movement, muscle overactivity, discomfort, positioning difficulties, and secondary changes to muscle and connective tissue. Medical interventions and rehabilitation practices may be used in conjunction when appropriate.

=== Rehabilitation ===
Physical and occupational therapy can help patients with strengthening exercises, task-specific movements, position, and mobility. A systematic review of strengthening interventions after stroke found improvements in muscle strength and activity without worsening of spasticity. The selection and intensity of rehabilitation interventions is at the discretion of the patient's tolerance and therapist's plan. Stretching, splinting with casts, orthotic devices, and serial casting are techniques utilized for patients with positioning difficulties or restricted joint movements.

=== Oral medications ===
Oral medications may be used to reduce muscle overactivity or spasticity that makes comfort, mobility, positioning, or personal care more difficult. Commonly used medications include baclofen, benzodiazapines, tizanidine, and dantrolene, and are at the discretion of the provider in terms of usage. The use of these medications may be limited by adverse effects such as sedation or weakness.

=== Focal intervention ===
Botulinum toxin injections may be used for focal or multifocal spasticity affecting specific muscles. Botulinum toxin reduces muscle activity by inhibiting the release of acetylcholine at the neuromuscular junction. Phenol or alcohol neurolysis injections can also be considered depending on patient circumstance.

=== Intrathecal baclofen and surgical interventions ===
Intrathecal baclofen therapy delivers baclofen into the fluid surrounding the spinal cord through an implanted pump and catheter. This treatment is considered in select patients with severe or widespread spasticity when other treatments are insufficient or not well tolerated. Surgical approaches, such as selective dorsal rhizotomy or hyperselective neurectomy, can also be considered depending on the patient's needs.

== See also ==
- Upper motor neuron lesion
- Stroke rehabilitation
- Strength training
- Cerebral palsy
- Spinal cord injury
- Acquired brain injury
- Physiotherapy
- Traumatic brain injury
- Motor control
