= Paratonia =

Muscular disorder

Frontal lobe (in blue)/Lobes of the brain

Paratonia is the inability to relax muscles during muscle tone assessment. There are two types of paratonia: oppositional and facilitatory. Oppositional paratonia ("gegenhalten") occurs when subjects involuntarily resist passive movements, while facilitatory paratonia ("mitgehen") occurs when subjects involuntarily assist with passive movements. Both types of paratonia have been associated with cognitive impairment or mental disorders, particularly in relation to frontal lobe dysfunction. Paratonia is frequently encountered in association with dementia.

Paratonia can be assessed with rating scales during clinical examination. Paratonia scale is a semi-quantitative score to rate the amount of oppositional and facilitatory paratonia separately. Kral modified procedure is a more objective semi-quantitative rating of upper limb facilitatory paratonia easily applicable while patients are seated. The Paratonia Assessment Instrument (PAI) was also used in a physiotherapic setting for the assessment of oppositional paratonia.

In 2017 facilitatory and oppositional paratonia have been assessed with surface electromyography, allowing a quantitative measure and better characterization of paratonia. Recording paratonia with electromyography on elbow flexor and extensors during repetitive continuous or discontinuous elbow movements may help distinguish paratonia from other forms of altered muscle tone. Both facilitatory and oppositional paratonia increase during continuous flexion and extension movements, moreover, oppositional paratonia increases with movement velocity. Spasticity also is velocity-dependent, but, differently from oppositional paratonia, if repeatedly elicited decreases instead of increasing. Conversely, parkinsonian rigidity is independent from movement velocity and probably also from movement repetition.

== See also ==
- Muscle tone
- Hypertonia
- Hypotonia
- Dementia
