= Flaccid paralysis =

Weakness, paralysis, and reduced tone in a muscle due to nerve damage

- Pronunciation: /ˈflæksɪd pəˈrælɪsɪs/ FLAK-sid pə-RAL-iss-iss
- Specialty: Neurology

Flaccid paralysis is a neurological condition characterized by weakness or paralysis and reduced muscle tone without other obvious cause (e.g., trauma). This abnormal condition may be caused by disease or by trauma affecting the nerves associated with the involved muscles. For example, if the somatic nerves to a skeletal muscle are severed, then the muscle will exhibit flaccid paralysis. When muscles enter this state, they become limp and cannot contract. This condition can become fatal if it affects the respiratory muscles, posing the threat of suffocation. It also occurs in the spinal shock stage in complete transection of the spinal cord occurring in injuries such as gunshot wounds.

== Causes ==
=== Polio and other viruses ===
The term acute flaccid paralysis (AFP) is often used to describe an instance with a sudden onset, as might be found with polio.

AFP is the most common sign of acute polio, and used for surveillance during polio outbreaks. AFP is also associated with a number of other pathogenic agents including enteroviruses other than polio, echoviruses, West Nile virus, and adenoviruses, among others.

=== Botulism ===
The Clostridium botulinum bacteria are the cause of botulism. Vegetative cells of C. botulinum may be ingested. Introduction of the bacteria may also occur via endospores in a wound. When the bacteria are in vivo, they induce flaccid paralysis. This happens because C. botulinum produces a toxin that blocks the release of acetylcholine. Botulism toxin blocks the exocytosis of presynaptic vesicles containing acetylcholine (ACh). When this occurs, the muscles are unable to contract. Other symptoms associated with infection from this neurotoxin include double vision, blurred vision, drooping eyelids, slurred speech, difficulty swallowing, dry mouth, and muscle weakness. Botulism prevents muscle contraction by blocking the release of acetylcholine, thereby halting postsynaptic activity of the neuromuscular junction. If its effects reach the respiratory muscles, then it can lead to respiratory failure, leading to death.

=== Curare ===
Curare is a plant poison derived from – among other species – Chondrodendron tomentosum and various species belonging to the genus Strychnos, which are native to the rainforests of South America. Certain peoples indigenous to the region – notably the Macushi – crush and cook the roots and stems of these and certain other plants and then mix the resulting decoction with various other plant poisons and animal venoms to create a syrupy liquid in which to dip their arrow heads and the tips of their blowgun darts. Curare has also been used medicinally by South Americans to treat madness, dropsy, edema, fever, kidney stones, and bruises. Curare acts as a neuromuscular blocking agent that induces flaccid paralysis. This poison binds to the acetylcholine (ACh) receptors on the muscle, blocking them from binding to ACh. As a result, ACh accumulates within the neuromuscular junction, but since ACh cannot bind to the receptors on the muscle, the muscle cannot be stimulated. This poison must enter the bloodstream for it to work. If curare affects the respiratory muscles, then its effects can become life-threatening, placing the victim at risk for suffocation.

=== Other ===
Flaccid paralysis can be associated with a lower motor neuron lesion. This is in contrast to an upper motor neuron lesion, which often presents with spasticity, although early on this may present with flaccid paralysis.

Included in AFP's list are poliomyelitis (polio), transverse myelitis, Guillain–Barré syndrome, enteroviral encephalopathy, traumatic neuritis, Reye's syndrome, etc.

An AFP surveillance programme is conducted to increase case yield of poliomyelitis. This includes collection of two stool samples within fourteen days of onset of paralysis and identification of virus, and control of the outbreak and strengthening immunization in that area.

Historical records from the 1950s, modern CDC reports, and recent analysis of patterns in India suggest that flaccid paralysis may be caused in some cases by oral polio vaccinations.

Venomous snakes that contain neurotoxic venom such as kraits, mambas, and cobras can also cause complete flaccid paralysis. Some chemical warfare nerve agents such as VX can also cause complete flaccid paralysis.

In some situations, prominently in those of oriental descent hyperthyroidism can affect the consumption and restoration equilibrium of potassium ions in neurons resulting in hypokalaemic paralysis.
