= PURA =

Protein-coding gene in the species Homo sapiens

Identifiers
- Aliases: PURA, PUR-ALPHA, PUR1, PURALPHA, MRD31, purine-rich element binding protein A, purine rich element binding protein A, NEDRIHF
- External IDs: OMIM: 600473; MGI: 103079; GeneCards: PURA

Gene location (Human)
Chr.	Chromosome 5 (human)
Band	5q31.3	Start	140,107,777 bp
Band	5q31.3	End	140,125,619 bp

Gene location (Mouse)
Chr.	Chromosome 18 (mouse)
Band	18|18 B2	Start	36,414,150 bp
Band	18|18 B2	End	36,425,588 bp
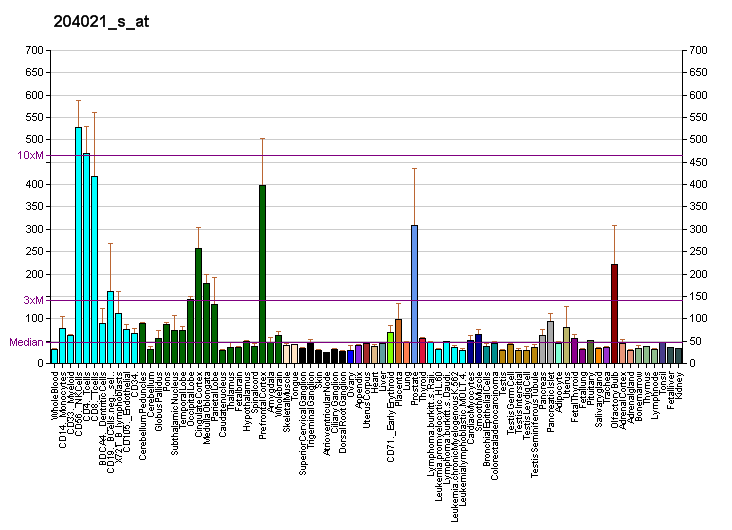

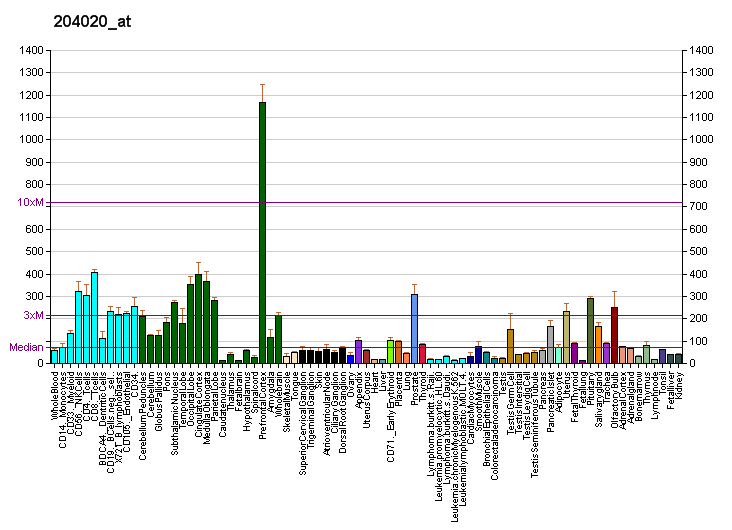
RNA expression pattern
Bgee	Human / Mouse (ortholog); Top expressed in: Brodmann area 23; middle temporal gyrus; Epithelium of choroid plexus; dorsal motor nucleus of vagus nerve; postcentral gyrus; ventral tegmental area; superior vestibular nucleus; subthalamic nucleus; inferior ganglion of vagus nerve; pons / Top expressed in: ventral tegmental area; cerebellar vermis; superior colliculus; lobe of cerebellum; mammillary body; dorsomedial hypothalamic nucleus; pontine nuclei; dorsal tegmental nucleus; lateral geniculate nucleus; median eminence; More reference expression data
BioGPS	More reference expression data
Gene ontology
Molecular function	DNA binding; double-stranded telomeric DNA binding; DNA-binding transcription factor activity; transcription factor binding; purine-rich negative regulatory element binding; translation repressor activity, mRNA regulatory element binding; single-stranded DNA binding; protein binding; transcription factor activity, RNA polymerase II distal enhancer sequence-specific binding; double-stranded DNA binding; SMAD binding; RNA binding; RNA polymerase II transcription regulatory region sequence-specific DNA binding; DNA-binding transcription factor activity, RNA polymerase II-specific; DNA-binding transcription repressor activity, RNA polymerase II-specific; sequence-specific DNA binding
Cellular component	cytoplasm; soma; dendrite; DNA replication factor A complex; nucleus; dendrite cytoplasm; postsynapse; glutamatergic synapse
Biological process	cell differentiation; negative regulation of translation; regulation of transcription, DNA-templated; transcription, DNA-templated; nervous system development; regulation of cell population proliferation; DNA replication initiation; positive regulation of cell population proliferation; negative regulation of transcription, DNA-templated; DNA unwinding involved in DNA replication; regulation of transcription by RNA polymerase II; negative regulation of transcription by RNA polymerase II; dendritic transport of messenger ribonucleoprotein complex; lymphocyte proliferation; epithelial cell proliferation
Sources:Amigo / QuickGO
Orthologs
Databases	NCBI: entry; OMA: entry
Species	Human	Mouse
Entrez	5813	19290
Ensembl	ENSG00000185129	ENSMUSG00000043991
UniProt	Q00577	P42669
RefSeq (mRNA)	NM_005859	NM_008989
RefSeq (protein)	NP_005850	NP_033015
Location (UCSC)	Chr 5: 140.11 – 140.13 Mb	Chr 18: 36.41 – 36.43 Mb
PubMed search
- Wikidata
View/Edit Human	View/Edit Mouse

Pur-alpha is a protein that in humans is encoded by the PURA gene located at chromosome 5, band q31.

Pur-alpha is an ancient, multi-functional DNA- and RNA-binding protein. PURA is expressed in every human tissue, where it exists as a protein of 322 amino acids. According to convention, PURA, the gene, is written italicized in all upper case letters. Pur-alpha, the protein, is written with the first letter capitalized and can be found listed as Pur-alpha, Pur-α, Pura, Puralpha, Pur alpha and Pur1.

== Evolutionary conservation and function ==
Pur-alpha was the first sequence-specific single-stranded DNA-binding protein to be discovered in higher organisms (GenBank M96684.1; GI:190749). It binds to both single-stranded and double-stranded DNA, making contact with G residues in the purine-rich strand of its binding site. Cumulative data shows that Pur-alpha preferentially binds to the sequence (G_{2-4}N_{1-3})_{n}, where N is not G. N denotes a nucleotide, and n denotes the number of repeats of this small sequence. N may be repeated up to three times in this sequence. Following the identification of a Pur factor, which specifically bound a purine-rich sequence in the control region of the c-MYC gene, the gene, PURA, encoding the protein, Pur-alpha, was cloned and sequenced for both human and mouse (GenBank U02098.1). Pur-alpha belongs to the four-member Pur protein family, which also includes Pur-beta (GenBank AY039216.1; GI:14906267) and two forms of Pur–gamma (Variant A, GenBank AF195513.2; Variant B, GenBank AY077841).

Pur protein sequences from bacteria through humans contain an amino acid segment that is strongly conserved (see NCBI smart00712). Human Pur-alpha contains three repeats of this Pur domain and bacterial Pur-alpha contains one. This evolutionary conservation means that the specific sequence of this domain is important for the survival of most species throughout the spectrum of living organisms. This essential nature of the Pur domain piques interest because the functions of Pur-alpha in lower organisms and in humans differ greatly. For example, Pur-alpha is essential for brain and blood cell development in mammals, but bacteria have no brain and no blood. In humans Pur-alpha functions to activate transcription in the nucleus, to facilitate RNA transport in the cytoplasm and to regulate DNA replication in the cell cycle. In certain functions Pur-alpha interacts with family member Pur-beta. Several cell cycle regulatory functions may be mediated by Pur-alpha binding to Cyclin/Cdk protein kinases, which phosphorylate proteins regulating cell cycle transition points. Requirements for Pur-alpha in all organisms are united by Pur-alpha's ability to bind nucleic acids coupled to its ability to interact with regulatory and transport proteins.

== Relevance in human diseases ==
=== Genetic perturbation in leukemia and anti-proliferative effect ===
PURA, located at chromosome 5 band q31, is frequently deleted in myelodysplastic syndrome (MDS), a disorder of white blood cells, that may progress to acute myelogenous leukemia (AML). Loss of one copy of chromosome 7 is also frequent in MDS. PURB, the gene encoding Pur-beta, is located at 7p13. A visual fluorescence analysis of chromosomes from MDS patients shows that deletions of PURA at 5q31 are more strongly linked to progression of MDS to AML when combined with deletions of the PURB gene, including complete loss of chromosome 7. All of the PURA deletions noted, involve only one of the two paired, parentally-derived chromosomes. The implication is that Pur-alpha and -beta are each codominantly expressed, and that haploid levels are insufficient for a protective effect against cancer. All known PURA deletions in people occur in only one of the two copies of chromosome 5.

Inducing increased levels of Pur-alpha in several different cultured cancer cell lines blocks cell proliferation. It also blocks anchorage-independent colony formation, a hallmark of cancer. This is true whether Pur-alpha is microinjected or expressed after introducing a cloned PURA cDNA into cells. The Pur-alpha inhibition of cancer cell proliferation occurs at specific points in the cell division cycle, primarily at checkpoints for transition to DNA replication or mitosis. These cell cycle effects are consistent with an interaction between Pur-alpha and CDK, cell cycle-dependent protein kinases. They are also consistent with documented interaction between Pur-alpha and the tumor suppressor protein, Rb.

=== Role in mammalian brain development and neurological diseases ===
Studies of genetic inactivation of PURA in the mouse provided evidence leading to that for PURA gene disorders in brain disease. Homozygous PURA knockouts die shortly after birth with severe defects in brain layer development, tissue wasting and movement disorders. Defects in blood cell development are also prominent, and it is not known how these may affect the brain. Heterozygous knockouts do not die early but exhibit seizure-like disorders. In rat hippocampal neurons, Pur-alpha is found in the cytoplasm together with mRNA transcripts, in a complex including non-coding RNAs, Pur-beta, fragile X mental retardation proteins and microtubule-associated proteins. This complex is transported by a kinesin motor to sites of translation at junctions of nerve cell dendrites. Recently PURA mutations have been found in multiple patients with brain disorders of a similar phenotype including hypotonia, developmental delay, movement disorders, and seizure or seizure-like movements. This spectrum of brain disorders is similar to the phenotype of a central nervous system syndrome termed the 5q31.3 microdeletion syndrome, and is the basis for a proposed PURA Syndrome based on PURA mutations rather than just deletions.

=== Influence on HIV-1 replication ===
In the brain Pur-alpha plays a role in diseases involving glial cells, cells that support nerve cells, as well as diseases involving nerve cells. These diseases include neuro-AIDS. Pur-alpha binds to a regulatory RNA element, called TAR, in the HIV-1 genome. This activates the expression of Tat, a transcriptional activator of its own gene. Pur-alpha binds TAR, allowing Tat to bind an adjacent TAR site to stimulate transcription. Pur-alpha then binds to the Tat protein itself. Pur-alpha also binds Cyclin T1, a regulatory partner of Cdk9 protein kinase, necessary for Tat activity. Cyclin T1/Cdk9 phosphorylates a region of RNA polymerase II. Such phosphorylation of the polymerase enhances its ability to complete RNA synthesis and stimulates replication of the HIV-1 RNA genome.

=== Cooperative effect with HIV-1 on JC polyomavirus replication and expression ===
Pur-alpha participates in development of progressive multifocal leukoencephalopathy (PML), a loss of the nerve sheath formed by oligodendroglial cells. Although HIV-1 is not usually found in these glial cells, HIV-1 proteins can pass through cell membranes to enter them. JCV is considered the causative agent of PML. JCV is activated in the glial cells by certain states of immune system suppression, including HIV-1 infection. There is a documented interaction between Pur-alpha, the HIV-1 protein, Tat, and a Pur-alpha-binding regulatory sequence in JCV DNA. Pur-alpha acts by altering both replication and gene expression of JCV.

=== Role in amyotrophic lateral sclerosis (ALS) ===
Pur-alpha plays a role in ALS, otherwise known as Lou Gehrig's disease. ALS is a motor neuron disease involving both the brain and spinal cord, resulting in progressive loss of muscle control. ALS has several contributing causes, but the most common familial form is due to an expanded repeat of the hexanucleotide GGGGCC at the chromosomal locus C9ORF72. The C9ORF72 hexanucleotide repeat expansion (HRE) is capable of binding Pur-alpha very tightly. Pur-alpha may act in ALS directly by binding this DNA repeat expansion or its single-stranded RNA transcript. One potential consequence of this binding would be to influence an unconventional translation of this transcript repeat that results in long dipeptide repeats. This is termed RAN (Repeat Associated Non-ATG) translation initiation. Aberrant Pur-alpha association with its RNA sequence segment may also be a feature of ALS types that do not involve C9ORF72 expansion. Addition of Pur-alpha suppresses neurodegeneration in mouse neuronal cells and in Drosophila expressing the C9ORF72 HRE. Pur-alpha also reverses neuronal changes caused by defects in the gene, FUS, which can lead to ALS. The mechanism of action of Pur-alpha in ALS is not known. There is presently no evidence that the PURA sequence itself is mutated in the C9ORF72 form of ALS. Rather, it is a regulatory nucleic acid sequence to which Pur-alpha binds that is altered.
