= Spasticity =

Abnormal stiffness of skeletal muscle

- Specialty: Neurology, physical medicine and rehabilitation

Spasticity (from Greek spasmos- 'drawing, pulling') is a feature of altered skeletal muscle performance with a combination of paralysis, increased tendon reflex activity, and hypertonia. It is also colloquially referred to as an unusual "tightness", stiffness, or "pull" of muscles.

Clinically, spasticity results from the loss of inhibition of motor neurons, causing excessive velocity-dependent muscle contraction. This ultimately leads to hyperreflexia, an exaggerated deep tendon reflex. Spasticity is often treated with the drug baclofen, which acts as an agonist at GABA receptors, which are inhibitory.

Spastic cerebral palsy is the most common form of cerebral palsy, which is a group of permanent movement problems that do not get worse over time. GABA's inhibitory actions contribute to baclofen's efficacy as an anti-spasticity agent.

== Pathophysiology ==
Spasticity is usually caused by damage to nerve pathways within the brain or spinal cord that control muscle movement. This can cause an imbalance in the inhibitory and excitatory signals sent to the muscles.

Spasticity mostly occurs in disorders of the central nervous system (CNS) affecting the upper motor neurons in the form of a lesion, such as spastic diplegia, or upper motor neuron syndrome, and can also be present in various types of multiple sclerosis, where it occurs as a symptom of the progressively-worsening attacks on myelin sheaths and is thus unrelated to the types of spasticity present in neuromuscular cerebral palsy rooted spasticity disorders.

The cause of spasticity is thought to be where an imbalance occurs in the excitatory and inhibitory input to α motor neurons caused by damage to the spinal cord and/or central nervous system. The damage causes a change in the balance of signals between the nervous system and the muscles, leading to increased excitability in muscles. This is common in people who have cerebral palsy, brain injuries or a spinal cord injury, but it can happen to anybody e.g. having a stroke.

One factor that is thought to be related to spasticity is the stretch reflex. This reflex is important in coordinating normal movements in which muscles are contracted and relaxed and in keeping the muscle from stretching too far. Although the result of spasticity is problems with the muscles, spasticity is actually caused by an injury to a part of the central nervous system (the brain or spinal cord) that controls voluntary movements. The damage causes a change in the balance of signals between the nervous system and the muscles. This imbalance leads to increased activity (excitability) in the muscles. Receptors in the muscles receive messages from the nervous system, which sense the amount of stretch in the muscle and sends that signal to the brain. The brain responds by sending a message back to reverse the stretch by contracting or shortening.

Characteristic features, analogy, and pathophysiology of common types of hypertonia. GTO – Golgi Tendon Organ

Overall, a defining feature of spasticity is that the increased resistance to passive stretch is velocity-dependent. Lance (1980) describes it this way: "...a motor disorder, characterised by a velocity-dependent increase in tonic stretch reflexes (muscle tone) with exaggerated tendon jerks, resulting from hyper-excitability of the stretch reflex as one component of the upper motor neurone (UMN) syndrome".

Spasticity is found in conditions where the brain and/or spinal cord are damaged or fail to develop normally; these include cerebral palsy, multiple sclerosis, spinal cord injury and acquired brain injury including stroke. Damage to the CNS as a result of stroke or spinal cord injury, alter the [net inhibition] of peripheral nerves in the affected region. This change in input to bodily structures tends to favor excitation and therefore increase nerve excitability. CNS damage also causes nerve cell membranes to rest in a more [depolarized] state. The combination of decreased inhibition and an increased depolarized state of cell membranes, decreases action potential threshold for nerve signal conduction, and thus increases activity of structures innervated by the affected nerves (spasticity). Muscles affected in this way have many other potential features of altered performance in addition to spasticity, including muscle weakness; decreased movement control; clonus (a series of involuntary rapid muscle contractions often symptomatic of muscle over-exertion and/or muscle fatigue); exaggerated deep tendon reflexes; and decreased endurance.

== Spasticity and clonus ==
Clonus (i.e. involuntary, rhythmic, muscular contractions and relaxations) tends to co-exist with spasticity in many cases of stroke and spinal cord injury likely due to their common physiological origins. Some consider clonus as simply an extended outcome of spasticity. Although closely linked, clonus is not seen in all patients with spasticity. Clonus tends to not be present with spasticity in patients with significantly increased muscle tone, as the muscles are constantly active and therefore not engaging in the characteristic on/off cycle of clonus. Clonus results due to an increased motor neuron excitation (decreased action potential threshold) and is common in muscles with long conduction delays, such as the long reflex tracts found in distal muscle groups. Clonus is commonly seen in the ankle but may exist in other distal structures as well, such as the knee or spine.

== Characteristics of spasticity ==
Characteristics of spasticity

A commonly known feature of spasticity, known as Clasp-knife response is the sudden decrease of tone after initial resistance, also referred to as a lengthening reaction or a "catch-yield sequence". This is because of inverse stretch reflex activation mediated by the Golgi tendon organ on sustained muscle stretching resulting in sudden relaxation of the muscle.

Another characteristic of spasticity, which may be referred to as "seatbelt effect" of spasticity, is different as the amount of resistance offered by the muscle is directly proportional to velocity of the passive movement. It is caused by increased muscle spindle excitability and velocity sensitivity of Ia spindle afferent nerve fibres, resulting in excessive activation of alpha motor neurons of the spinal cord. It is similar to the tug we feel initially while pulling the seatbelt of a car beyond a certain velocity, hence the name "seatbelt effect".

== Diagnosis ==
The clinical underpinnings of two of the most common spasticity conditions, spastic cerebral palsy and multiple sclerosis, can be described as follows: in spastic diplegia, the upper motor neuron lesion arises often as a result of neonatal asphyxia, while in conditions like multiple sclerosis, spasticity is thought by some to be as a result of the autoimmune destruction of the myelin sheaths around nerve endings—which in turn can mimic the gamma amino butyric acid deficiencies present in the damaged nerves of spastic cerebral palsy children, leading to roughly the same presentation of spasticity, but which clinically is fundamentally different from the latter.

=== Grading ===
Spasticity can be graded on scales including the modified Ashworth scale, the Tardieu scale and the Penn spasm frequency scale.

=== Assessment ===
Spasticity is assessed by feeling the resistance of the muscle to passive lengthening in its most relaxed state. A spastic muscle will have immediately noticeable, often quite forceful, increased resistance to passive stretch when moved with speed and/or while attempting to be stretched out, as compared to the non-spastic muscles in the same person's body (if any exist). Spasticity can be differentiated from rigidity with the help of simple clinical examination, as rigidity is a uniform increase in the tone of agonist and antagonist muscles which is not related to the velocity at which the movement is performed passively and remains the same throughout the range of movement while spasticity is a velocity-dependent increase in tone resulting from the hyperexcitability of stretch reflexes. It primarily involves the antigravity muscles – flexors of the upper limb and extensors of the lower limb. During the passive stretch, a brief "free interval" is appreciated in spasticity but not in rigidity because the resting muscle is electromyographically silent in spasticity. In contrast, in rigidity, the resting muscle shows firing.

As there are many features of the upper motor neuron syndrome, there are likely to be multiple other changes in affected musculature and surrounding bones, such as progressive malalignments of bone structure around the spastic muscles (leading for example to the scissor gait and tip-toeing gait due to ankle equinus or ankle planter flexion deformity in spastic cerebral palsy children, scissor gait is caused by spasticity of the hip adductor muscles while tip-toeing gait is caused by spasticity of the gastrocnemius-soleus muscle complex or calf musculature. Also, following an upper motor neuron lesion, there may be multiple muscles affected, to varying degrees, depending on the location and severity of the upper motor neuron damage. The result for the affected individual, is that they may have any degree of impairment, ranging from a mild to a severe movement disorder. A relatively mild movement disorder may contribute to a loss of dexterity in an arm, or difficulty with high level mobility such as running or walking on stairs. A severe movement disorder may result in marked loss of function with minimal or no volitional muscle activation. There are several scales used to measure spasticity, such as the King's hypertonicity scale, the Tardieu, and the modified Ashworth. Of these three, only the King's hypertonicity scale measures a range of muscle changes from the UMN lesion, including active muscle performance as well as passive response to stretch.

Assessment of a movement disorder featuring spasticity may involve several health professionals depending on the affected individual's situation, and the severity of their condition. This may include physical therapists, physicians (including neurologists and rehabilitation physicians), orthotists and occupational therapists. Assessment is needed of the affected individual's goals, their function, and any symptoms that may be related to the movement disorder, such as pain. A thorough assessment will include analysis of posture, active movement, muscle strength, movement control and coordination, and endurance, as well as spasticity (response of the muscle to stretch). Spastic muscles typically demonstrate a loss of selective movement, including a loss of eccentric control (decreased ability to actively lengthen). While multiple muscles in a limb are usually affected in the upper motor neuron syndrome, there is usually an imbalance of activity, such that there is a stronger pull in one direction, such as into elbow flexion. Decreasing the degree of this imbalance is a common focus of muscle strengthening programs. Spastic movement disorders also typically feature a loss of stabilisation of an affected limb or the head from the trunk, so a thorough assessment requires this to be analysed as well.

Secondary effects are likely to impact on assessment of spastic muscles. If a muscle has impaired function following an upper motor neuron lesion, other changes such as increased muscle stiffness are likely to affect the feeling of resistance to passive stretch. Other secondary changes such as loss of muscle fibres following acquired muscle weakness are likely to compound the weakness arising from the upper motor neuron lesion. In severely affected spastic muscles, there may be marked secondary changes, such as muscle contracture, particularly if management has been delayed or absent.

== Treatment ==
Treatment should be based on assessment by relevant health professionals. For spastic muscles with mild-to-moderate impairment, exercise should be the mainstay of management, and is likely needed to be prescribed by a physiatrist (a doctor specialized in rehabilitation medicine), occupational therapist, physical therapist, accredited exercise physiologist (AEP) or other health professional skilled in neurological rehabilitation.

Muscles with severe spasticity are likely to be more limited in their ability to exercise, and may require help to do this. In spastic cerebral palsy children the main treatment modality of spasticity is conservative in the form of botulinum toxin A injection and various physical therapy modalities such as serial casting, sustained stretching and medical pharmacologic treatment. Spasticity in cerebral palsy children is usually generalized although with varying degrees of severity across the affected extremities and trunk musculature. Neglected or inappropriately treated spasticity can eventually lead to joint contractures. Both spasticity and contractures can cause joint subluxations or dislocations and severe gait difficulties. In the event of contracture there is no role for conservative treatment. Hip dislocation and ankle equinus deformity are known to arise from muscle spasticity primarily. Orthopedic surgical reconstruction of the hip is commonly practiced to improve sitting balance, nursing care and relieve hip pain. Treatment should be done with firm and constant manual contact positioned over nonspastic areas to avoid stimulating the spastic muscle(s). Alternatively, rehabilitation robotics can be used to provide high volumes of passive or assisted movement, depending on the individual's requirements; this form of therapy can be useful if therapists are at a premium, and has been found effective at reducing spasticity in patients with strokes. For muscles that lack any volitional control, such as after complete spinal cord injury, exercise may be assisted, and may require equipment, such as using a standing frame to sustain a standing position.

A general treatment guideline can be followed that involves:

- The initial focus on first activating contraction of antagonist muscles to provide reciprocal inhibition and lengthen spastic muscles
- Reciprocal actions are attempted. Agonist contractions are performed first in small ranges progressing to larger arcs of movement
- Highly stressful activities be minimized early in training
- Functional skills are targeted for training
- Patients and family/caregivers should be educated about the importance of maintaining range of motion and doing daily exercise

Medical interventions may include oral medications such as baclofen, clonazepam, clonidine, diazepam, or dantrolene. If refractive to oral agents, spasticity may be treated with intrathecal baclofen therapy (IBT) when spasticity. IBT may also be used in patients with limited tolerance to other modalities. Phenol injections can be used, or botulinum toxin injections into the muscle belly, to attempt to dampen the signals between nerve and muscle. The effectiveness of medications vary between individuals, and vary based on location of the upper motor neuron lesion (in the brain or the spinal cord). Medications are commonly used for spastic movement disorders, but research has not shown functional benefit for some drugs. Some studies have shown that medications have been effective in decreasing spasticity, but that this has not been accompanied by functional benefits. Surgery could be required for a tendon release in the case of a severe muscle imbalance leading to contracture. In spastic CP, selective dorsal rhizotomy has also been used to decrease muscle overactivity.

Incorporating hydrotherapy in the treatment program may help decrease spasm severity, promote functional independence, improve motor recovery and decrease medication required for spasticity, which may help reduce the side effects that are possible with oral drug treatments. A 2004 study compared the effects of hydrotherapy on spasticity, oral baclofen dosage and Functional Independence Measure (FIM) scores of patients with a spinal cord injury (SCI). It was found that subjects who received hydrotherapy treatment obtained increased FIM scores and a decreased intake of oral baclofen medication. A 2009 study looked at the effect of hydrotherapy to decrease spasticity on post-stroke, hemiparetic patients with limited mobility and concluded that there was a significantly larger increase in FIM scores compared to the control group that did not receive hydrotherapy.

== Prognosis ==
The prognosis for those with spastic muscles depends on multiple factors, including the severity of the spasticity and the associated movement disorder, access to specialised and intensive management, and ability of the affected individual to maintain the management plan (particularly an exercise program). Most people with a significant UMN lesion will have ongoing impairment, but most of these will be able to make progress. The most important factor to indicate ability to progress is seeing improvement, but improvement in many spastic movement disorders may not be seen until the affected individual receives help from a specialised team or health professional.

== Research ==
Doublecortin positive cells, similar to stem cells, are extremely adaptable and, when extracted from a brain, cultured and then re-injected in a lesioned area of the same brain, they can help repair and rebuild it. The treatment using them would take some time to be available for general public use, as it has to clear regulations and trials.

== History ==
Historical progression of spasticity and the upper motor neuron lesion on which it is based has progressed considerably in recent decades. However, the term "spasticity" is still often used interchangeably with "upper motor neuron syndrome" in the clinical settings, and it is not unusual to see patients labeled as "spastic" who actually demonstrate not just spasticity alone, but also an array of upper motor neuron findings.

Research has clearly shown that exercise is beneficial for spastic muscles, even though in the very early days of research it was assumed that strength exercise would increase spasticity. Also, from at least the 1950s through at least the 1980s, there was a strong focus on other interventions for spastic muscles, particularly stretching and splinting, but the evidence does not support these as effective. While splinting is not considered effective for decreasing spasticity, a range of different orthotics are effectively used for preventing muscle contractures on patients with spasticity. In the case of spastic diplegia there is also a permanent neurosurgical treatment for spasticity, selective dorsal rhizotomy, that directly targets nerves in the spine that cause the spasticity, and destroys them, so that the spasticity cannot be activated at all.

== See also ==
- Brunnstrom Approach
- Gamma-aminobutyric acid
- Pronator drift
- Rhizotomy
- Stroke rehabilitation
- Tizanidine
- Transverse myelitis
