= Golgi tendon reflex =

Muscular function

The Golgi tendon reflex (also called inverse stretch reflex, autogenic inhibition, tendon reflex) is an inhibitory effect on the muscle resulting from the muscle tension stimulating Golgi tendon organs (GTO) of the muscle, and hence it is self-induced. The reflex arc is a negative feedback mechanism preventing too much tension on the muscle and tendon. When the tension is extreme, the inhibition can be so great it overcomes the excitatory effects on the muscle's alpha motorneurons causing the muscle to suddenly relax. This reflex is also called the inverse myotatic reflex, because it is the inverse of the stretch reflex.

GTOs' inhibitory effects come from their reflex arcs: the Ib sensory fibers that are sent through the dorsal root into the spinal cord to synapse on Ib inhibitory interneurons that in turn terminate directly on the motor neurons that innervate the same muscle. The fibers also make direct excitatory synapses onto motoneurons that innervate the antagonist muscle. Note that the disynaptic reflex pathway does not always have inhibitory effects: under certain conditions, GTO stimulation can result in motoneuron excitation.

Besides protecting against too much tension on the muscle and tendon, the tendon reflex may help spread muscle load throughout the muscle fibers, thereby preventing damage to isolated fibers. Whereas the stretch reflex regulates muscle length, the tendon reflex helps regulate muscle force. It helps maintain steady levels of tension and stable joints to counteract effects that reduce muscle force (such as fatigue). Because the Ib inhibitory interneurons receive convergent multisensory inputs and descending pathways, they may allow fine control of muscle forces, and may be better at protective functions. Also, because the Ib fibers connect widely with the motoneurons innervating muscles working on different joints, the Golgi tendon reflex forms part of reflex networks that control movements of the whole limb.

== Protective function, autogenic inhibition, and others ==
The Golgi tendon reflex operates as a protective feedback mechanism to control the tension of an active muscle by causing relaxation before the tendon tension becomes high enough to cause damage. First, as a load is placed on the muscle, the afferent neuron from the Golgi tendon organ fires into the central nervous system. Second, the motor neuron from the spinal cord is inhibited via an IPSP and muscle relaxes.

Because the Ib inhibitory interneurons receive convergent descending pathways and multisensory inputs—including cutaneous receptors, muscle spindles, and joint receptors, they can provide better protection, such as when the joint receptors are signaling joint hyperextension or hyperflexion.

Autogenic inhibition refers to a reduction in excitability of a contracting or stretched muscle, that in the past has been solely attributed to the increased inhibitory input arising from Golgi tendon organs (GTOs) within the same muscle. It was first thought GTOs only had protective function which was to prevent muscles from damages because of the assumptions that they always inhibited motoneurons and that they fired only under high tension. But it is now known that GTOs signal muscle tension continuously providing precise information about muscle force, that the reflex pathway has multisensory inputs that may allow precise control of muscle forces for fine activities, and that Ib fibers connect widely with motoneurons innervating muscles acting on different joints, which when complemented with their reflex pathways, are part of reflex networks that control movements of the whole limbs.

The reduced efferent (motor) drive to the muscle by way of autogenic inhibition is a factor historically believed to assist target muscle elongation, although current literature casts doubt on this hypothesis.

=== Protective steps ===
With muscle tension, a Golgi tendon reflex operates as follows:

1. As tension is applied to a tendon, the Golgi tendon organ (sensor) is stimulated (depolarized)
2. Nerve impulses (action potentials) arise and propagate along sensory fiber Ib into the spinal cord
3. Within the spinal cord (integrating center), sensory fiber Ib synapses with and activates (via glutamate) an inhibitory interneuron
4. The inhibitory interneuron releases the neurotransmitter glycine that inhibits (hyperpolarizes) the α motor neuron
5. As a consequence fewer nerve impulses are generated in the α motor neuron
6. The muscle relaxes and excess tension is relieved

== Flexibilities ==
The output of the Ib inhibitory interneurons are flexible because they receive inputs from golgi tendon organs, muscle spindles, cutaneous receptors, joint receptors, and different descending pathways. The multiple sensory/control inputs may allow fine motor activities, such as grasping a delicate object, in which other senses may guide force control. In addition, stimulating GTO does not always inhibit motor neurons, because during activities such as walking, the Ib inhibitory interneurons are inhibited, and Ib excitatory interneurons stimulate the motoneurons.

== Contrast to stretch reflex ==
The stretch reflex operates as a feedback mechanism to control muscle length by causing muscle contraction. In contrast, the tendon reflex operates as a negative feedback mechanism to control muscle tension. Although the tendon reflex is less sensitive than the stretch reflex, it can override the stretch reflex when tension is great, for example, causing a person to drop a very heavy weight. Like the stretch reflex, the tendon reflex is ipsilateral. The sensory receptors for this reflex are called tendon Golgi receptors, which lie within a tendon near its junction with a muscle. In contrast to muscle spindles, which are sensitive to changes in muscle length, tendon organs detect and respond to changes in muscle tension that are caused by muscular contraction, but not passive stretch.

== Pathology ==
Upper motor neuron lesions which damage the descending pathways down to the spinal cord may cause increase in muscle tone, partly because alpha motoneurons respond more to muscle spindle afferent inputs. This causes increased resistance to passive movement (that the patient does not initiate), called spasticity, which is associated with another neurological sign, the clasp-knife response, in which the spastic muscle initially resists passive movement strongly, and then suddenly yields—like the motion of a pocketknife. The increased initial resistance comes from the stretch reflex hyperactivity, and the sudden collapse may involve the Golgi tendon reflex. The response is also known as the lengthening reaction because of the spastic muscle's reaction to lengthening.

== See also ==
- H-reflex
- Motor control
- Reflex action
