= Wet noodle =

Slang term

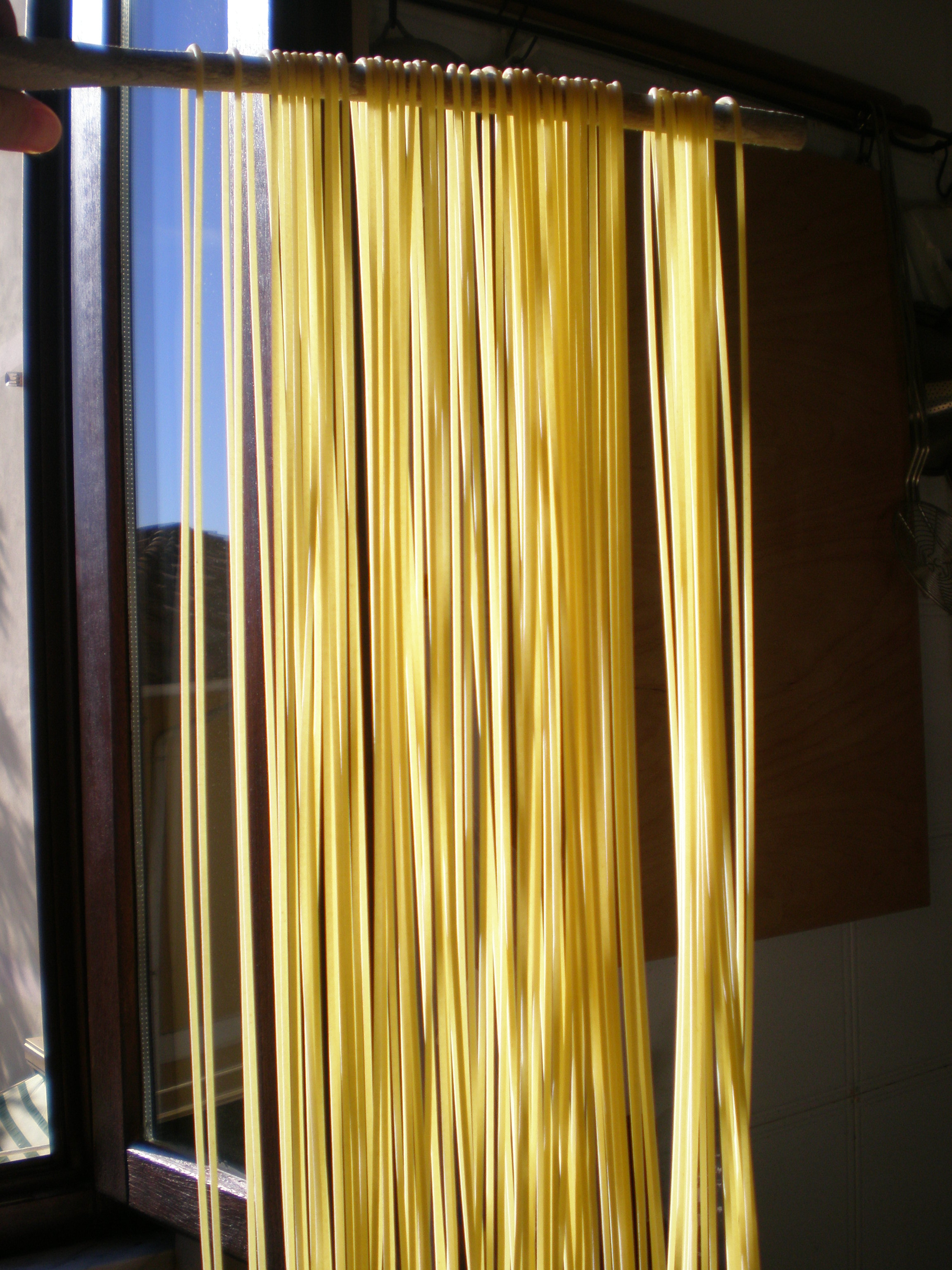
Spaghettoni hung out to dry

A wet noodle is a strip or string of pasta that has become soft and flaccid after being soaked in water, in contrast to noodles, which are straight and stiff when dry. The term is used largely as a metaphor. Examples include:

- Referring facetiously to a whipping mechanism that is impractical and has no injurious effects, or to someone who is not any fun or who is lazy.
- As part of a metaphor for unproductive action because pushing a wet noodle, as opposed to pulling it, accomplishes nothing. George S. Patton is said to have used a wet noodle on a plate to demonstrate an aphorism on the need for leadership, saying "Gentlemen, you don't push the noodle, you pull it."
- In snowshoeing, a wet noodle-type binding is an "old standby" that is appropriate for gentle terrain. Also known as an H binding, it may have been nicknamed because it gets wet and slippery.
- In model airplane design, the wet noodle theory refers to materials that are stronger in tension than in compression, thus they can be pulled on with more force than other materials, despite their higher risk of collapsing.
