= Selective dorsal rhizotomy =

Neurosurgical procedure performed on the spinal cord

Rhizotomy
- Pronunciation: /raɪˈzɒtəmi/ ry-ZOT-ə-mee
- ICD-9-CM: 03.1
- MeSH: D019051

A selective dorsal rhizotomy (SDR), also known as a rhizotomy, dorsal rhizotomy, or a selective posterior rhizotomy, is a neurosurgical procedure that selectively cuts problematic nerve roots in the spinal cord. (Note: This article deals with Selective Dorsal Rhizotomy (SDR) rather than the rhizotomy procedures for pain relief; for those procedures, which have begun to take the name "rhizotomy" in certain instances, see facet rhizotomy and similar. A facet rhizotomy is just one of many different forms of radiofrequency ablation, and its use of the "rhizotomy" name should not be confused with the SDR procedure.) This procedure has been well-established in the literature as a surgical intervention and is used to relieve negative symptoms of neuromuscular conditions such as spastic diplegia and other forms of spastic cerebral palsy. The specific sensory nerves inducing spasticity are identified using electromyographic (EMG) stimulation and graded on a scale of 1 (mild) to 4 (severe spasticity). Abnormal nerve responses (usually graded a 3 or 4) are isolated and cut, thereby reducing symptoms of spasticity.

Spasticity is defined as a velocity-dependent increase in muscle tone in response to a stretch. This upper motor neuron condition results from a lack of descending input from the brain that would normally release the inhibitory neurotransmitter gamma amino butyric acid (GABA), which serves to dampen neuronal excitability in the nervous system. Spasticity is thought to be caused by an excessive increase of excitatory signals from sensory nerves without proper inhibition by GABA. Two common conditions associated with this lack of descending input are cerebral palsy and acquired brain injury.

== Background ==
Selective dorsal rhizotomy (SDR), less often referred to as selective posterior rhizotomy (SPR), is the most widely used form of rhizotomy, and is today a primary treatment for spastic diplegia, best done in the youngest years before bone and joint deformities from the pull of spasticity take place. Still, it can be performed safely and effectively on adults as well.

SDR is a permanent procedure that addresses the spasticity at its neuromuscular root: i.e., in the central nervous system that contains the misfiring nerves that cause the spasticity of those particular muscles in the first place. After SDR, the person's spasticity is usually eliminated, revealing the "real" strength (or lack thereof) of the muscles underneath. SDR's result is fundamentally unlike orthopedic surgical procedures, where spasticity is left untreated.

Because there is always temporary weakness after SDR, patients should work hard to strengthen the weak muscles with physical therapy and learn habits of movement and daily tasks in a body without spasticity.

SDR is usually performed on the pediatric spastic cerebral palsy population between the ages of 2 and 6. This is the age range where orthopedic deformities from spasticity have not yet occurred or are minimal. It is also variously claimed by clinicians that another advantage of doing the surgery so young is that it is inherently easier for these young children to restrengthen their muscles and to re-learn how to walk, often having the effect that later in life, they do not even remember the period when they lived with the spasticity at all. However, recent cases of successful SDR procedures among those with spastic diplegia across all age ranges (years 3–50) have proven its universal effectiveness and safety regardless of the age of the spastic diplegic patient. A counter-argument against the prevailing view concerning the younger years is that it may actually be quicker and easier to restrengthen an older patient's musculature, and regaining walking may happen faster with an older patient because the patient is fully matured and very aware of what is going on, and so may work harder and with more focus than might a young child. These two schools of thought have equally objectively valid bases for their formation and, thus, are each defended quite intensely by their respective proponents.

== History ==
In 1913 Otfrid Foerster in Germany reported the results of dorsal root rhizotomy on patients with spastic cerebral palsy. Rhizotomy for spasticity purposes did indeed then proceed to take about a fifty-year hiatus. In 1967 Claude Gros and his colleagues at the neurosurgical hospital (CHU Gui de Chauliac) in Montpellier resurrected posterior rhizotomy for spasticity. Fasano of Italy in 1978 introduced 'selective' posterior rootlet rhizotomy for cerebral palsy patients and Warwick Peacock developed the Gros technique in Cape Town, South Africa, by exposing the cauda equina, rather than at the spinal cord level. Peacock moved to Los Angeles in 1986 and began widely campaigning for SDR's viability in cerebral palsy spasticity relief. Peacock and the surgeons he subsequently trained developed the procedure further using their own clinical-intellectual refinements and refinements in medical equipment and technology that occurred from the 1980s through the 2000s (decade).

Today, St. Louis Children's Hospital in St. Louis, Missouri, has a "Center for Cerebral Palsy Spasticity" that is the only internationally known clinic in the world to have conducted concentrated first-hand clinical research on SDR over an extended period. Its chief neurosurgeon in the field, Doctor T.S. Park (who was initially trained by Peacock), has performed over five thousand SDR surgeries since 1987, some of them on adults, and is the originator of the L1-single-level laminectomy modification to the SDR surgery in 1991, which sections the first dorsal root and enables the removal of significantly less spine-bone than in surgeries performed before 1991, as well as the inherent release of the hip flexor muscles specifically as a result of that particular sectioning—prior to that, total hip flexor release was not necessarily possible. That L1-laminectomy modification has since become the standard method, and SLCH has become internationally known as a major provider of SDR surgery to those in need. This clinic believes that patients with spastic diplegia, hemiplegia, or quadriplegia should have spasticity reduced first through SDR before undergoing muscle or tendon release procedures, and other surgeons today share this view. A major qualifier in the cases taken on at SLCH, however, is that all of its adults have had relativelymild cases of spastic diplegia.

In September 2008, SDR was performed that 'closed the gap' on concerns regarding age of the patient in SDR: Columbia-Presbyterian Children's Hospital's Richard C.E. Anderson performed an SDR surgery on a 28-year-old male with moderate spastic diplegia, which by the patient's own report has reduced his muscle tone nearly to the level of a "normal" person and enabled him to walk and exercise much more efficiently; also, Anderson in the past performed an SDR on a 16-year-old wheelchair-using female with severe spastic diplegia. Reportedly, that particular SDR enabled the young woman to ambulate, whereas before the surgery, she was too tight to do so. In 2011, Anderson reported that another 16-year-old patient of his was considering undergoing the rhizotomy, but that patient subsequently decided to put her decision on hold. And in July 2011, after offering her several months of consultation, the medical team at the Continuing Care department of Gillette Children's Specialty Healthcare performed an SDR procedure on a local young-adult Minnesota resident.Meanwhile, many countries such as the United Kingdom, Russia, and China adopted the dorsal rhizotomy to treat spastic cerebral palsy.

== Medical uses ==
Not all people with spastic cerebral palsy benefit from SDR. For those under 18 years of age, rhizotomy requires that they be:

- At least two years of age
- Diagnosis of spastic diplegia, spastic triplegia, spastic quadriplegia, or spastic hemiplegia
- Some form of independent mobility; for example, crawling or walking with or without an assistive device
- History of premature birth; if born at full term, child must have typical signs of spastic cerebral palsy
- No severe damage to the basal ganglia on MRI examination
- Potential for improvement in functional skills

For adults between 19 and 50 years of age, rhizotomy requires:

- Diagnosis of spastic diplegia and hemiplegia.
- History of premature birth
- Currently can ambulate independently.
- No fixed orthopedic deformities that either prevent current walking or would prevent walking after SDR.
- Potential for functional gains after SDR.
- Motivated to attend physical therapy and perform home exercise program.

=== Long-term effects ===
The long-term effects of SDR have been reported. Selective dorsal rhizotomy surgery has been performed routinely over the past several decades on children with spastic cerebral palsy, and the accumulated evidence indicates positive long-term outcomes.

=== Required circumstances ===
All candidates for rhizotomy must have good muscle strength in the legs and trunk. There must also be evidence of adequate motor control or the ability to make reciprocal movements for crawling or walking and to move reasonably quickly from one posture to another. Chiefly, pediatric rhizotomy candidates are people with CP who have shown age-appropriate progression in motor development. Still, spasticity hampers the development of skills and/or causes gait patterns like the scissors gait. In adults, the primary requirements are that the person be able to ambulate independently, but spasticity limits energy, flexibility, walking speed, and balance and sometimes causes pain/muscle spasms.

== Criteria ==
The criteria for patient eligibility from the St. Louis Children's Hospital are:

=== Walk independently ===
After the surgery, all patients walking independently before surgery regained independent walking within a few weeks after surgery. Patients maintain independent walking for the long term; when others have more difficulty walking independently they may eventually need an assistive device. In nearly all cases, spasticity can be eliminated and the quality of independent walking improves; however, physical therapy and braces become unnecessary after SDR. Orthopedic surgery is rarely required after SDR.

=== Walk with walkers or crutches ===
In children who are 2–7 years old and walk with a walker or crutches before SDR, independent walking after the procedure is possible. Once they have achieved independent walking, they can maintain it.

In children who are older than 7 years and walk with crutches, independent walking (inside or outside house) is possible. If they walk with walker at the age, they will most likely walk with a walker or crutches after the procedure, though it improves the quality of assisted walking and transition movements, and alleviates deformities of the legs. Many of these patients will need orthopedic surgeries after SDR.

=== Contraindications ===
There are a few clinical situations in which someone is not likely to be a suitable candidate for the surgery. These include those who have had severe meningitis, a congenital (birth-originating) brain infection, congenital hydrocephalus unrelated to premature birth, head trauma, or certain familial diseases. Also precluded are people who have a "mixed" CP with predominant dystonia, and those who have severe scoliosis. However, as with any procedure, an individual evaluation is needed to determine eligibility.

== Procedural outline ==
SDR begins with a 1- to 2-inch incision along the center of the lower back just above the waist. An L1 laminectomy is then performed: a section of the spine's bone, the spinous processes together with a portion of the lamina, are removed, like a drain-cap, to expose the spinal cord and spinal nerves underneath. Ultrasound and an X-ray locate the tip of the spinal cord, where there is a natural separation between sensory and motor nerves. A rubber pad is then placed to separate the motor from the sensory nerves. The sensory nerve roots, each of which will be tested and selectively eliminated, are placed on top of the pad, while the motor nerves are beneath the pad, away from the operative field.

After the sensory nerves are exposed, each sensory nerve root is divided into 3–5 rootlets. Each rootlet is tested with electromyography, which records electrical patterns in muscles. Rootlets are ranked from 1 (mild) to 4 (severe) for spasticity. The severely abnormal rootlets are cut. This technique is repeated for rootlets between spinal nerves L2 and S2. Half of the L1 dorsal root fibers are cut without EMG testing.

The neurosurgical team at Seattle Children's Hospital has modified the surgical approach described above by tailoring the selection of nerve root sectioning to the individual patient. This technique selectively analyzes each individual nerve root with electromyography to separate dorsal and ventral nerve roots through comparison of stimulus responses. Researchers have utilized objective feedback from the nerve root compared to the above-mentioned approach that relies on subjective visualization to identify motor versus sensory nerve roots, thus improving the likelihood of sectioning only those nerves of interest. Another important difference between the two approaches is the location of the laminectomy to expose the nerve roots. At Seattle Children's, the laminectomy is performed below the termination of the spinal cord (conus), potentially reducing the risk of injury.

When testing and corresponding elimination are complete, the dura mater is closed, and fentanyl is given to bathe the sensory nerves directly. The other layers of tissue, muscle, fascia, and subcutaneous tissue are sewn. The skin is typically now closed with glue, but there are sometimes stitches to be removed from the back after 3 weeks. The surgery takes approximately 4 hours and typically involves one neurosurgeon, one anesthesiologist, and possibly an assortment of assisting physicians (as in the New York City September 2008 case). The patient then goes to the recovery room for 1–2 hours before being transferred to the intensive care unit overnight. Transfer from the ICU to a recovery room in the hospital is then done to enable direct post-surgical observation by the neurosurgeon and surgical team, but this usually lasts only about 3 days, during which the team performs range-of-motion tests that they record and compare to pre-surgery levels. After that short period, the patient, depending on circumstances and appropriateness, is either transferred to inpatient recovery or is linked to an intense outpatient exercise program and discharged from the hospital.

According to clinicians, it usually takes about one year from the date of surgery to achieve maximum results from SDR. However, videos from St. Louis Children's Hospital website have shown continued marked improvement as much as five years post-surgery, and presumably, if the person keeps exercising intensely, potential for continued improvement and strengthening is, just as in a person born with normal muscle tone and range of motion, unlimited.

Selective dorsal rhizotomy can alleviate contractures caused by spasticity from before the surgery takes place; also it prevents any more contractures or spasticity from occurring in the future. With or without rhizotomy, the only way contractures can ever be relieved is via orthopaedic surgery. Fixed orthopaedic deformities of the legs caused by the previous years of intense spasticity are also not relieved by the SDR and must also be corrected surgically.

== Complications ==
There is always abnormal sensitivity and tingling of the skin on the feet and legs after SDR because of the nature of the nerves that have been worked on, but this usually resolves within six weeks. There is no way to prevent the abnormal sensitivity in the feet. Transient change in bladder control may occur, but this also resolves within a few weeks.

If a certain degree of permanent numbness remains in certain leg muscles, such as the quadriceps, ankles, and feet, this is usually not enough to prevent feeling and sensation, sensing of changes in temperature or pressure, etc. The affected muscle areas simply feel less than before, and the trade-off in ease of movement is said to be immensely worth this change, should it occur.

There is a risk of any of the following more serious risks happening as a result of SDR.

- Permanent paralysis of the legs and bladder.
- Sensory loss and/or numbness.
- Wound infection and meningitis – usually controlled with antibiotics.
- Leakage of the spinal fluid through the wound, also repairable; the surgical team watches very closely post-surgery for this.

== Post-surgical rehabilitation ==
Outcomes following a SDR can vary based on the number of nerves cut during surgery, joint deformities, muscle contractures, and level of impairment before the procedure. Following the procedure, the child will likely experience muscle weakness, which can be corrected with physical therapy (PT). PT is imperative to restore functional status in the shortest amount of time. Physical therapy post SDR aims to promote independent walking, improved gait pattern, transfers, balance, and upper limb motor control. It is important to remember SDR does not cause permanent muscle weakness, rather it is temporary a few weeks following the procedure. A strengthening program is beneficial to combat this expected weakness and improve lower extremity range of motion and facilitate a near normal gait pattern.

This Leeds Children's Hospital website was used as a sample post-rehabilitation protocol. Week 1 post surgery, the child will typically have 30 minute physical therapy sessions for the first four days followed by an increase up to 45 minutes during days 5–7. During the second week, sessions range from 45 to 60 minutes with a focus on stretching, strengthening, developmental milestones (if appropriate), and a standing program. If necessary, an orthotic assessment can be performed during the second week. Weeks 3 through 6 focus on the previously mentioned items but adding gait training, assessment for the need of assistive devices, and preparing a home program for the patient. Six weeks to three months following the procedure the patient will attend outpatient physical therapy 3 to 5 times a week for 45–60 minutes and focusing primarily on stretching, strengthening, ambulation, and assessing for the need for adaptive equipment such as a tricycle. Three to six months focus on all previous therapies with emphasis on developing proper gait mechanics. At this point, frequency of the sessions will typically decrease to 2-3 times per week. Six to twelve months post surgery focuses on all of the above with increased emphasis on movement patterns the child may be having difficulty with. One year post procedure, frequency of sessions is 1 to 2 times per week to continue working on strengthening and refining motor control and orthotic needs continued to be monitored.

== See also ==
- Spastic diplegia
- Cerebral palsy
- Baclofen
- Botox
- Phenol
