= Scissor gait =

Form of gait abnormality

Scissor gait is a form of gait abnormality primarily associated with spastic cerebral palsy. That condition and others like it are associated with an upper motor neuron lesion.

== Presentation ==
This gait pattern is reminiscent of a marionette. Hypertonia in the legs, hips and pelvis means these areas become flexed to various degrees, giving the appearance of crouching, while tight adductors produce extreme adduction, presented by knees and thighs hitting, or sometimes even crossing, in a scissors-like movement while the opposing muscles, the abductors, become comparatively weak from lack of use. Most common in patients with spastic cerebral palsy, the individual is often also forced to walk on tiptoe unless the plantarflexor muscles are released by an orthopedic surgical procedure.

These features are most typical with the scissors gait and usually result in some form and to some degree regardless of the mildness or severity of the spastic CP condition:

- rigidity and excessive adduction of the leg in swing
- plantar flexion of the ankle
- flexion at the knee
- adduction and internal rotation at the hip
- progressive contractures of all spastic muscles
- complicated assisting movements of the upper limbs when walking.

=== Conditions associated with a scissor gait ===
- Arthrogryposis
- Spastic diplegia
- Pernicious anemia
- Cerebrovascular accident
- Cervical spondylosis with myelopathy (a problem with the vertebrae in the neck)
- Liver failure
- Multiple sclerosis
- Spinal cord trauma
- Spinal cord tumor
- Syphilitic meningomyelitis
- Syringomyelia
- other forms of Cerebral palsy
