= Clonus =

Set of involuntary and rhythmic muscular contractions and relaxations

- Specialty: Neurology

Ankle clonus

Clonus is a set of involuntary and rhythmic muscular contractions and relaxations. Clonus is a sign of certain neurological conditions, particularly associated with upper motor neuron lesions involving descending motor pathways and, in many cases, is accompanied by spasticity (another form of hyperexcitability). Unlike small spontaneous twitches known as fasciculations (usually caused by lower motor neuron pathology), clonus causes large motions that are usually initiated by a reflex. Studies have shown clonus beat frequency to range from three to eight Hz on average and may last a few seconds to several minutes depending on the patient's condition.

== Signs ==
Clonus is most commonly found at the ankle, specifically with a dorsiflexion/plantarflexion movement (up and down). Some case studies have also reported clonus in the finger, toe, and laterally in the ankle (as opposed to the typical up and down motion).

- Ankle (medial gastrocnemius)
- Patella (knee cap)
- Triceps surae
- Biceps brachii

== Cause ==
Clonus is typically seen in people with cerebral palsy, stroke, multiple sclerosis, spinal cord damage and hepatic encephalopathy. It can occur in epilepsy as part of a generalized tonic–clonic seizure, and in pregnant women presenting with severe pre-eclampsia and eclampsia. It can also be an adverse drug reaction, such as after ingestion of potent serotonergic drugs, where clonus strongly predicts imminent serotonin toxicity (serotonin syndrome).

== Mechanism ==
=== Hyperactive stretch reflexes ===
The self re-excitation of hyperactive stretch reflexes theory involves a repetitive contract-relax cycle in the affected muscle, which creates oscillatory movements in the affected limb.

In order for self re-excitation to exist, both an increase in motor neuron excitability and nerve signal delay are required. Increased motor neuron excitability is likely accomplished by alterations to the net inhibition of neurons occurring as a result of injury to the central nervous system (CNS) (stroke/ spinal cord injury). This lack of inhibition biases neurons to a net excitatory state, therefore increasing total signal conduction.

Signaling delay is present due to an increased nerve conduction time. Long delays are primarily due to long reflex pathways, which are common in distal joints and muscles. This may therefore explain why clonus is typically found in distal structures like the ankle. Frequency of clonus beats have been found to be directly proportional to the length of the reflex pathway it is found in.

=== Central oscillator ===
Clonus, with respect to the presence of a central oscillator, functions on the theory that when the central oscillator is turned on by a peripheral event, it will continue to rhythmically excite motor neurons, therefore creating clonus.

Although the two proposed mechanisms are very different in [theory] and are still debated, some studies now propose the potential of both mechanisms co-existing to create clonus. It is thought that the stretch reflex pathway may be stimulated first, and through its events, cause a decreased synaptic current threshold. This decreased synaptic current threshold would enhance motor neuron excitability as nerve impulses would be more readily conducted, and thus turn on this central oscillator. This theory is still being investigated.

=== Clonus and spasticity ===
Clonus tends to co-exist with spasticity in many cases of stroke and spinal cord injury likely due to their common physiological origins. Some consider clonus as simply an extended outcome of spasticity. Although closely linked, clonus is not seen in all patients with spasticity. Clonus tends to not be present with spasticity in patients with significantly increased muscle tone, as the muscles are constantly active and therefore not engaging in the characteristic on/off cycle of clonus.

Clonus results due to an increased motor neuron excitation (decreased action potential threshold) and is common in muscles with long conduction delays, such as the long reflex tracts found in distal muscle groups. Clonus is commonly seen in the ankle but may exist in other distal structures as well.

== Diagnosis ==
Clonus at the ankle is tested by rapidly flexing the foot into dorsiflexion (upward), inducing a stretch to the gastrocnemius muscle. Subsequent beating of the foot will result, however only a sustained clonus (10 beats or more) is considered abnormal. Clonus can also be tested in the knees by rapidly pushing the patella (knee cap), towards the toes.

== Voluntary induction in healthy people ==
Gregory Bateson described the induction of clonus in healthy people:

Balance is a partly involuntary and unconscious business, dependent on "spinal reflexes." When provided with appropriate context, these reflexes go into oscillation that is called "clonus," a phenomenon that is familiar to everybody and which is easily produced. (While sitting, place the leg with thigh horizontal and foot supported on the floor. Move the foot inward toward you so that the heel is off the floor and the ball of the foot supports the weight of the leg. When the weights and angles are correctly adjusted, an oscillation will start in the muscle of the calf with a frequency of about six to eight per second and an amplitude of about half an inch at the knee. This oscillation is called clonus in neurophysiology and is a recurrent series of patellar reflexes, generated in a feedback circuit. The effect of each contraction is fed back as a modification of tension to the calf muscle. This change of tension triggers the next patellar reflex.)

— Gregory Bateson, A Sacred Unity, p. 85

In the text, Bateson goes on to describe induction of clonus as a key element of Balinese ritual.

== See also ==
- Myoclonus
- Generalized tonic–clonic seizure
- Stretch reflex
- Tetany
- Tetanic contractions
