= PURA syndrome =

- Other names: PURA-related neurodevelopmental disorder
- Specialty: Medical genetics
- Symptoms: Developmental, speech and walking delays with epilepsy and other associated anomalies
- Causes: Mutation in the PURA gene, located on Chromosome 5 at 5q31.3
- Prevention: None
- Prognosis: Medium (with treatment)
- Frequency: very rare, with about 750-800 patients identified worldwide (June 25)
- Deaths: -

PURA syndrome, also known as PURA-related neurodevelopmental disorder, is a rare novel genetic disorder arising from haploinsufficiency of the PURA gene. It codes for the protein PURA (name is compliant with international conventions), which was historically also named Pur-alpha, MRD31, or PUR1. The discovery of the PURA Syndrome in 2014 marked the identification of a novel etiological class of intellectual disability syndromes tied to an RNA/DNA-binding protein. Clinically, the syndrome is characterized by developmental and speech delay, neo-natal hypotonia, failure to thrive, excessive sleepiness, epilepsy, and other anomalies. At the molecular level, PURA is a multifunctional protein involved in the regulation of a large number of genes, affecting dendritic mRNA transport, and cytoskeletal dynamics. Disruption of PURA therefore impairs multiple neuronal processes which explains the profound neurological phenotype. Diagnosis is confirmed through genetic testing and management remains supportive.

== Description ==
Patients (usually children, but including adults) with this disorder usually show:

- Widespread developmental delay
- Speech delay
- Balance and walking difficulties (may learn to walk at a later-than-average age or may never be ambulatory)
- Hypotonia
- Feeding difficulties (dysphagia is one of the causes)
- Epilepsy
- Excessive daytime sleepiness
- Chronic hypothermia
- Apnea
- Hypoventilation
- Kyphosis and Scoliosis
- Visual disturbances including Strabismus and Nystagmus

Breathing problems often resolve after the age of one.

== Causes ==
This disorder is caused by mutations in the PURA gene, in chromosome 5. This gene is essential for the formation of PURA, a protein which controls the activity of various genes on the transcriptional and translational level. It is also important for the normal development of the brain. Different studies reported an impact of PURA on growth and division of neurons, the formation and maturation of myelin, which is a substance that protects nerves and promotes efficient nerve impulse transmission. However, currently it is unclear how representative and reproducible these reports are, indicating the need for further studies. With few exceptions, PURA syndrome-causing mutations occur spontaneous (de novo), which means that they may appear in a baby whose family history is clear of the mutation. It has been shown that such pathological genetic variants are inherited in an autosomal dominant fashion.

== Discovery ==
Insight into human PURA haploinsufficiency (loss of one functional copy) emerged from 5q31.3 micro-deletion syndromes. Several reports in the 2000s described patients with interstitial deletions of chromosome 5q31.2-q31.3 that encompassed PURA, presenting with severe developmental delay, hypotonia, feeding difficulties abnormal breathing, and seizures. These cases suggested that mutations in the PURA gene could be a distinct syndrome. In 2014, PURA syndrome was discovered by two independent studies with a total of 15 cases. In parallel, the US-based researchers Seema Lalani and colleagues (Baylor College of Medicine, USA) and the British clinicians David Hunt and Diana Baralle (University of Southampton, UK) reported patients with mutations in the PURA gene that resulted in intellectual disability, hypotonia, epileptic seizures and neurodevelopmental delay.

== Epidemiology ==
PURA syndrome is rare. It's true prevalence rate is unknown (estimated to be in the range of 1:100,000) as the condition is only identified upon genomic testing of individuals with severe neurodevelopmental disorders. Because most cases are sporadic and de novo there is no known founder population or ethnic predilection. The lack of large-scale epidemiological data means estimates are based on case series. As of 2025, PURA Syndrome Foundation has recognized over 750 patients worldwide. These numbers, however, likely undercount true incidence as many cases remain unpublished.

In 2025, a patient was reported with comparably mild symptoms who inherited the pathological genetic variant to her daughter. This patient was identified because of her impaired speech skills and constitutes the first example of milder, so-far undetected symptoms, suggesting that a larger fraction of patients with undetected mild representations might exist.

== Neuroanatomical Correlates of PURA Syndrome ==
The structural brain correlates of PURA syndrome have been investigated by MRI in multiple case series. The most consistent finding is delayed or abnormal myelination. In one MRI imaging study of 32 patients, roughly 28–32% showed evidence of delayed white matter maturation. Other common, though nonspecific, features include cerebral volume loss and increased extra-axial fluid spaces. Corpus callosum abnormalities are frequent and the underdevelopment of the corpus callosum rostrum and thinning of the corpus callosum body have been reported in about 10% of cases. Ventricular enlargement (particularly of the lateral ventricles) is also occasionally found. Cerebellar anomalies are rare but have also been described. In summary, brain imaging in PURA syndrome patients often show a consistent pattern of underdevelopment of the white matter and delayed or reduced myelin formation, reflecting the critical role of PURA in neuronal and oligodendrocyte maturation.

== Diagnosis ==
The diagnosis of PURA syndrome relies on genetic testing. Because the clinical features are not entirely specific, differential diagnoses such as congenital hypotonic syndromes (e.g. Prader-Willi syndrome) and other genetic encephalopathies must be considered. Definitive diagnosis requires identification of a pathogenic heterozygous PURA variant or a chromosomal deletion including PURA. Current practice is to include PURA in gene panels for neurodevelopmental delay, hypotonia and epilepsy. Parental testing is usually done to confirm de novo status and assess recurrence risk. Diagnostic evaluation also includes clinical assessments: brain MRI to document structural features (especially myelination status), EEG for suspected seizures, and basic metabolic screens to rule out differential diagnosis. Because PURA syndrome is becoming increasingly well characterized, also awareness among clinicians is rising. The identification of a pathogenic PURA mutation provides a diagnosis and leads to individualized patient treatment and care.

== Management and treatment ==
There is no cure for PURA syndrome, and management is entirely supportive and symptomatic and so a multidisciplinary approach is recommended. Developmental therapies (physical and speech) are initiated early on to maximize the patient's abilities. Communication support (e.g. sign language, picture boards) may benefit the mostly nonverbal patients. Nutritional support is often required and gastroesophageal reflux is treated medically or surgically as needed. Respiratory support through CPAP and/or supplemental oxygen is provided for apnea especially in early life. Seizure control is a major therapeutic challenge. Standard epileptic drugs are used; however, seizures are often refractory. Case reports suggest that ketogenic diet may offer benefit in drug-resistant cases. The drugs Salbutamol and Pyridostigmin have been suggested based on individual reports. However, their use is very controversially discussed in the community and efficacy is still not proven due a lack of standardized clinical studies. One report described improvement in seizure frequency with ketogenic diet in a child with PURA syndrome. Ongoing research, including patient registries and biobank, are essential to better understand PURA syndrome and improve supportive care strategies as nearly all patients remain profoundly disabled and require full-time care.
