= Golgi tendon organ =

Proprioceptive sensory receptor organ

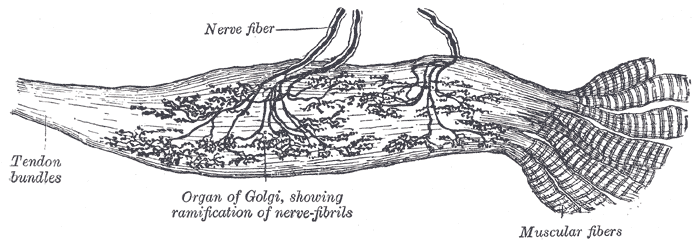
- Labeled diagram of Golgi tendon organ from the human Achilles tendon.

Details
- System: Musculoskeletal system
- Location: Skeletal muscle

Identifiers
- Latin: organum sensorium tendinis
- TH: H3.03.00.0.00024

The Golgi tendon organ (GTO) (also known as Golgi organ, tendon organ, neurotendinous organ or neurotendinous spindle) is a skeletal muscle stretch receptor proprioceptor. It is situated at the interface between a muscle and its tendon known as the musculotendinous junction. It senses muscle tension (whereas muscle spindles are responsible for detecting muscle length and changes in muscle length). It is innervated by type Ib sensory nerve fibers.

It represents the sensory leg of the Golgi tendon reflex arc.

The Golgi tendon organ is one of several eponymous terms named after the Italian physician Camillo Golgi.

== Structure ==
The body of the Golgi tendon organ is made up of braided strands of collagen (intrafusal fasciculi) that are less compact than elsewhere in the tendon and are encapsulated. The capsule is connected in series (along a single path) with a group of muscle fibers (10-20 fibers) at one end, and merge into the tendon proper at the other. Each capsule is about 1 mm long, has a diameter of about 0.1 mm.

One or more fast-conducting type Ib sensory nerve fibers penetrate the capsule and lose their medullary sheaths, branch, intertwine with the collagen fibers, and terminate as flattened leaf-like endings between the collagen strands (see figure).

== Function ==
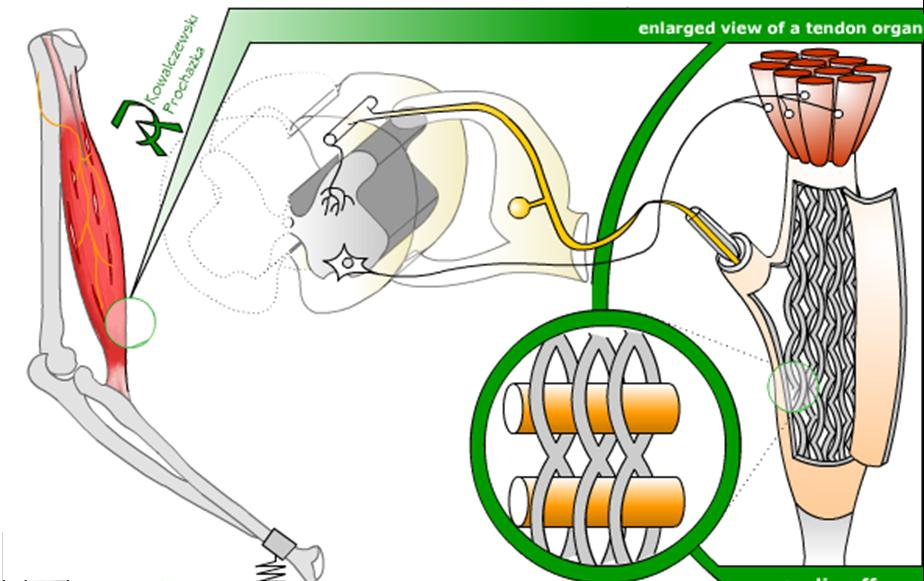
Mammalian tendon organ showing typical position in a muscle (left), neuronal connections in spinal cord (middle) and expanded schematic (right). The tendon organ is a stretch receptor that signals the force developed by the muscle. The sensory endings of the Ib afferent are entwined amongst the musculotendinous strands of 10-20 extrafusal muscle fibers. (Note: 3-25 extrafusal muscle fibers) See an animated version.

When the muscle generates force, the sensory terminals of the Ib afferent axons are compressed and become deformed which causes the opening of stretch-sensitive cation channels, depolarizing the axon and causing it to fire nerve impulses. The action potential frequency encodes the force being developed by the muscle fibers associated with the Golgi tendon organ. The average level of activity in a tendon organ population is representative of the whole muscle force.

=== Integrative function ===
The Ib sensory feedback generates stretch reflexes and supraspinal responses which control muscle contraction. Ib afferents synapse with interneurons in the spinal cord that also project to the brain cerebellum and cerebral cortex. The Golgi tendon reflex assists in regulating muscle contraction force. It is associated with the Ib. Tendon organs signal muscle force through the entire physiological range, not only at high strain.

During locomotion, Ib input excites rather than inhibits motoneurons of the receptor-bearing muscles, and it affects the timing of the transitions between the stance and swing phases of locomotion. The switch to autogenic excitation is a form of positive feedback.

The ascending or afferent pathways to the cerebellum are the dorsal and ventral spinocerebellar tracts. They are involved in the cerebellar regulation of movement.

== History ==
Until 1967, it was believed that Golgi tendon organs had a high threshold, only becoming active at high muscle forces. Consequently, it was thought that tendon organ input caused "weightlifting failure" through the clasp-knife reflex, which protected the muscle and tendons from excessive force. However, the underlying premise was shown to be incorrect by James Houk and Elwood Henneman in 1967.

== See also ==
- Golgi–Mazzoni corpuscles

== Sources ==
=== Other sources ===
- Saladin, KS (2018). "Chapter 13 - The Spinal Cord, Spinal Nerves, and Somatic Reflexes". Anatomy and Physiology: The Unity of Form and Function (8th ed.). New York: McGraw-Hill. ISBN 978-1-259-27772-6.
- Purves, Dale; Augustine, George J; Fitzpatrick, David; Hall, William C; Lamantia, Anthony Samuel; Mooney, Richard D; Platt, Michael L; White, Leonard E, eds. (2018). "Chapter 9 - The Somatosensory System: Touch and Proprioception". Neuroscience (6th ed.). Sinauer Associates. ISBN 9781605353807.
- Pearson, Keir G; Gordon, James E (2013). "35 - Spinal Reflexes". In Kandel, Eric R; Schwartz, James H; Jessell, Thomas M; Siegelbaum, Steven A; Hudspeth, AJ (eds.). Principles of Neural Science (5th ed.). United States: McGraw-Hill. ISBN 978-0-07-139011-8.
