= Modified Ashworth scale =

- Purpose: measure of spasticity

The Modified Ashworth scale (MAS) measures resistance during passive soft-tissue stretching and is used as a simple measure of spasticity. Scoring (taken from Bohannon and Smith, 1987):

- 0: No increase in muscle tone
- 1: Slight increase in muscle tone, manifested by a catch and release or by minimal resistance at the end of the range of motion when the affected part(s) is moved in flexion or extension
- 1+: Slight increase in muscle tone, manifested by a catch, followed by minimal resistance throughout the remainder (less than half) of the ROM
- 2: More marked increase in muscle tone through most of the ROM, but affected part(s) easily moved
- 3: Considerable increase in muscle tone, passive movement difficult
- 4: Affected part(s) rigid in flexion or extension
