= Hypotonia =

State of low muscle tone

- Specialty: Pediatrics
- Symptoms: Muscle weakness

Hypotonia is a state of low muscle tone (the amount of tension or resistance to stretch in a muscle), often involving reduced muscle strength. Hypotonia is not a specific medical disorder, but it is a potential manifestation of many different diseases and disorders that affect motor nerve control by the brain or muscle strength. Hypotonia is a lack of resistance to passive movement whereas muscle weakness results in impaired active movement. Central hypotonia originates from the central nervous system, while peripheral hypotonia is related to problems within the spinal cord, peripheral nerves, and/or skeletal muscles. Severe hypotonia in infancy is commonly known as floppy baby syndrome. Recognizing hypotonia, even in early infancy, is usually relatively straightforward, but diagnosing the underlying cause can be difficult and often unsuccessful. The long-term effects of hypotonia on a child's development and later life depend primarily on the severity of the muscle weakness and the nature of the cause. Some disorders have a specific treatment but the principal treatment for most hypotonia of idiopathic or neurologic cause is physical therapy and/or occupational therapy for remediation.

Hypotonia is thought to be associated with the disruption of afferent input from stretch receptors and/or lack of the cerebellum's facilitatory efferent influence on the fusimotor system, the system that innervates intrafusal muscle fibers thereby controlling muscle spindle sensitivity. On examination a diminished resistance to passive movement will be noted and muscles may feel abnormally soft and limp on palpation. Diminished deep tendon reflexes also may be noted. Hypotonia is a condition that can be helped with early intervention.

== Signs and symptoms ==
Central hypotonia accounts for 60 to 80% of all hypotonia in infants. Hypotonic patients may display a variety of objective manifestations that indicate decreased muscle tone. Motor skills delay is often observed, along with hypermobile or hyperflexible joints, drooling and speech difficulties, poor reflexes, decreased strength, decreased activity tolerance, rounded shoulder posture, with leaning onto supports, and poor attention. The extent and occurrence of specific objective manifestations depends upon the age of the patient, the severity of the hypotonia, the specific muscles affected, and sometimes the underlying cause. For instance, some people with hypotonia may experience constipation, while others have no bowel problems.

=== Floppy baby syndrome ===
The term "floppy infant syndrome" is used to describe abnormal limpness when an infant is born, affecting limbs, trunk, and head. Such condition may appear immediately after birth or during early life as inability to maintain proper posture during movement and rest. In severe cases, hypotonic infants have difficulty feeding, as their mouth muscles cannot maintain a proper suck-swallow pattern, or a good breastfeeding latch.

=== Developmental delay ===
Children with normal muscle tone are expected to achieve certain physical abilities within an average timeframe after birth. Most low-tone infants have delayed developmental milestones, but the length of delay can vary widely. Motor skills are particularly susceptible to the low-tone disability. They can be divided into two areas, gross motor skills, and fine motor skills, both of which are affected. Hypotonic infants are late in lifting their heads while lying on their stomachs, rolling over, lifting themselves into a sitting position, remaining seated without falling over, balancing, crawling, and sometimes walking. Fine motor skills delays occur in grasping a toy or finger, transferring a small object from hand to hand, pointing out objects, following movement with the eyes, and self-feeding.

Speech difficulties can result from hypotonia. Low-tone children learn to speak later than their peers, even if they appear to understand a large vocabulary, or can obey simple commands. Difficulties with muscles in the mouth and jaw can inhibit proper pronunciation, and discourage experimentation with word combination and sentence-forming. Since the hypotonic condition is actually an objective manifestation of some underlying disorder, it can be difficult to determine whether speech delays are a result of poor muscle tone, or some other neurological condition, such as intellectual disability, that may be associated with the cause of hypotonia. Additionally, lower muscle tone can be caused by Mikhail-Mikhail syndrome, which is characterized by muscular atrophy and cerebellar ataxia which is due to abnormalities in the ATXN1 gene.

=== Muscle tone vs. muscle strength ===
The low muscle tone associated with hypotonia must not be confused with low muscle strength or the definition commonly used in bodybuilding. Neurologic muscle tone is a manifestation of periodic action potentials from motor neurons.

"True muscle tone is the inherent ability of the muscle to respond to a stretch. For example, quickly straightening the flexed elbow of an unsuspecting child with normal tone, will cause their biceps to contract in response (automatic protection against possible injury). When the perceived danger has passed, (which the brain figures out once the stimulus is removed), the muscle relaxes and returns to its normal resting state."

"...The child with low tone has muscles that are slow to initiate a muscle contraction, contract very slowly in response to a stimulus, and cannot maintain a contraction for as long as his 'normal' peers. Because these low-toned muscles do not fully contract before they again relax (muscle accommodates to the stimulus and so shuts down again), they remain loose and very stretchy, never realizing their full potential of maintaining a muscle contraction over time. "

== Cause ==
The most common cause of central hypotonia in newborns is hypoxic ischemic encephalopathy. Brain malformations and inborn errors of metabolism account for 13% and 3% respectively. Causes that affect the central nervous systems are chromosomal disorders, inborn errors of metabolism, cerebral dysgenesis, and trauma to the brain and spinal cord. Metabolic causes include glycogen storage disease type II, pyruvate dehydrogenase deficiency, mitochondrial disease, Zellweger syndrome, Smith–Lemli–Opitz syndrome, and congenital disorder of glycosylation. Metabolic disorders in infants are usually presented with various other features such as dysmorphic feature, seizures, encephalopathy, biochemistry profile apart from hypotonia.

Some conditions known to cause hypotonia include:

Congenital – i.e. disease a person is born with (including genetic disorders presenting within 6 months)

- Genetic disorders are the most common cause
  - 22q13 deletion syndrome a.k.a. Phelan–McDermid syndrome
  - 3-Methylcrotonyl-CoA carboxylase deficiency
  - Achondroplasia
  - ADNP syndrome
  - Aicardi syndrome
  - Autism spectrum disorders
  - Canavan disease
  - Centronuclear myopathy (including myotubular myopathy)
  - Central core disease
  - CHARGE syndrome
  - Cohen syndrome
  - Costello syndrome
  - Dejerine–Sottas disease (HMSN Type III)
  - Down syndrome a.k.a. trisomy 21 — most common
  - Ehlers–Danlos syndrome
  - Familial dysautonomia (Riley–Day syndrome)
  - FG syndrome
  - Fragile X syndrome
  - GLUT1 deficiency syndrome
  - Griscelli syndrome Type 1 (Elejalde syndrome)
  - Holocarboxylase synthetase deficiency / Multiple carboxylase deficiency
  - Krabbe disease
  - Leigh's disease
  - Lesch–Nyhan syndrome
  - Marfan's syndrome
  - Menkes syndrome
  - Methylmalonic acidemia
  - Myotonic dystrophy
  - Niemann–Pick disease
  - Nonketotic hyperglycinemia (NKH) or Glycine encephalopathy (GCE)
  - Noonan syndrome
  - Neurofibromatosis
  - Patau syndrome a.k.a. trisomy 13
  - Pituitary dwarfism/growth hormone deficiency(in adults)
  - PURA syndrome
  - Prader–Willi syndrome — 2nd most common cause
  - Rett syndrome
  - Septo-optic dysplasia (de Morsier syndrome)
  - Snyder–Robinson syndrome (SRS)
  - Spinal muscular atrophy (SMA)
  - Succinic semialdehyde dehydrogenase deficiency (SSADH)
  - Tay–Sachs disease
  - Werdnig–Hoffmann syndrome – Spinal muscular atrophy with congenital degeneration of anterior horns of spinal cord. Autosomal recessive
  - Wiedemann–Steiner syndrome
  - Williams syndrome
  - Zellweger syndrome a.k.a. cerebrohepatorenal syndrome
- Developmental disability
  - Cerebellar ataxia (congenital)
  - Sensory processing disorder
  - Developmental coordination disorder
  - Hypothyroidism (congenital)
  - Hypotonic cerebral palsy
  - Teratogenesis from in utero exposure to benzodiazepines

=== Acquired ===
Acquired – i.e. onset occurs after birth

- Genetic
  - Muscular dystrophy (including myotonic dystrophy) – most common
  - Metachromatic leukodystrophy
  - Rett syndrome
  - Spinal muscular atrophy
- Infections
  - Encephalitis
  - Guillain–Barré syndrome
  - Infant botulism
  - Meningitis
  - Poliomyelitis
  - Sepsis
- Toxins
  - Infantile acrodynia (childhood mercury poisoning)
- Autoimmunity disorders
  - Myasthenia gravis – most common
  - Abnormal vaccine reaction
  - Celiac disease
- Metabolic disorder
  - Hypervitaminosis
  - Kernicterus
  - Rickets
- Neurological
  - Traumatic brain injury, such as the damage that is caused by shaken baby syndrome
  - Lower motor neuron lesions
  - Upper motor neuron lesions
- Miscellaneous
  - Central nervous system dysfunction, including cerebellar lesions and cerebral palsy
  - Hypothyroidism
  - Sandifer syndrome
  - Neonatal benzodiazepine withdrawal syndrome in children born to mothers treated in late pregnancy with benzodiazepine medications

== Diagnosis ==
The approach to diagnosing the cause of hypotonia (as with all syndromes in neurology) is first localization. The physician must first determine if the hypotonia is due to muscle, neuromuscular junction, nerve, or central cause. This will narrow the possible causes. If the cause of the hypotonia is found to lie in the brain, then it can be classified as a cerebral palsy. If the cause is localized to the muscles, it can be classified as a muscular dystrophy. If the cause is thought to be in the nerves, it is called hypotonia due to polyneuropathy. Many cases cannot be definitively diagnosed.

Diagnosing a patient includes obtaining family medical history and a physical examination, and may include such additional tests as computerized tomography (CT) scans, magnetic resonance imaging (MRI) scans, electroencephalogram (EEG), blood tests, genetic testing (such as chromosome karyotyping and tests for specific gene abnormalities), spinal taps, electromyography muscle tests, or muscle and nerve biopsy.

Mild or benign hypotonia is often diagnosed by physical and occupational therapists through a series of exercises designed to assess developmental progress, or observation of physical interactions. Since a hypotonic child has difficulty deciphering their spatial location, they may have some recognizable coping mechanisms, such as locking the knees while attempting to walk. A common sign of low-tone infants is a tendency to observe the physical activity of those around them for a long time before attempting to imitate, due to frustration over early failures. Developmental delay can indicate hypotonia.

MRI Brain is used to rule out structural malformations in the brain or metabolic disorders. Magnetic resonance spectroscopic imaging is used to detect metabolic disorders.

== Treatment ==
The outcome in any particular case of hypotonia depends largely on the nature of the underlying disease. In some cases, the underlying cause is treatable. But in general, treatment comprises providing supportive care with rehabilitation services, nutritional and respiratory support.

Along with normal pediatric care, specialists who may be involved in the care of a child with hypotonia include developmental pediatricians (specialize in child development), neurologists, neonatologists (specialize in the care of newborns), geneticists, occupational therapists, physical therapists, speech therapists, orthopedists, pathologists (conduct and interpret biochemical tests and tissue analysis), and specialized nursing care.

If the underlying cause is known, treatment is tailored to the specific disease, followed by symptomatic and supportive therapy for the hypotonia. In very severe cases, treatment may be primarily supportive, such as mechanical assistance with basic life functions like breathing and feeding, physical therapy to prevent muscle atrophy and maintain joint mobility, and measures to try to prevent opportunistic infections such as pneumonia. Treatments to improve neurological status might involve such things as medication for a seizure disorder, medicines or supplements to stabilize a metabolic disorder, or surgery to help relieve the pressure from hydrocephalus (increased fluid in the brain).

The National Institute of Neurological Disorders and Stroke states that physical therapy can improve motor control and overall body strength in individuals with hypotonia. This is crucial to maintaining both static and dynamic postural stability, which is important since postural instability is a common problem in people with hypotonia. A physiotherapist can develop patient specific training programs to optimize postural control, in order to increase balance and safety. To protect against postural asymmetries the use of supportive and protective devices may be necessary. Physical therapists might use neuromuscular/sensory stimulation techniques such as quick stretch, resistance, joint approximation, and tapping to increase tone by facilitating or enhancing muscle contraction in patients with hypotonia. For patients who demonstrate muscle weakness in addition to hypotonia strengthening exercises that do not overload the muscles are indicated. Electrical Muscle Stimulation, also known as Neuromuscular Electrical Stimulation (NMES) can also be used to "activate hypotonic muscles, improve strength, and generate movement in paralyzed limbs while preventing disuse atrophy". When using NMES it is important to have the patient focus on attempting to contract the muscle(s) being stimulated. Without such concentration on movement attempts, carryover to volitional movement is not feasible. NMES should ideally be combined with functional training activities to improve outcomes.

Occupational therapy can assist the patient with increasing independence with daily tasks through improvement of motor skills, strength, and functional endurance. Speech-language therapy can help with any breathing, speech, and/or swallowing difficulties the patient may be having. Therapy for infants and young children may also include sensory stimulation programs. A physical therapist may recommend an ankle/foot orthosis to help the patient compensate for weak lower leg muscles. Toddlers and children with speech difficulties may benefit greatly by using sign language.

== Terminology ==
The term hypotonia comes from the Ancient Greek ὑπο-, hypo-, 'under' and τόνος, tónos, from τείνω, teinō, 'to stretch'. Other terms for the condition include:

- Low muscle tone
- Benign congenital hypotonia
- Congenital hypotonia
- Congenital muscle hypotonia
- Congenital muscle weakness
- Amyotonia congenita
- Floppy baby syndrome
- Infantile hypotonia

== See also ==
- Hypertonia
