= Clasp-knife response =

Golgi tendon reflex

Clasp-knife response is a Golgi tendon reflex with a rapid decrease in resistance when attempting to flex a joint, usually during a neurological examination. It is one of the characteristic responses of an upper motor neuron lesion. It gets its name from the resemblance between the motion of the limb and the sudden closing of a claspknife after sufficient pressure is applied.

== Cause ==
When a joint is passively flexed, the resisting force comes from the stretch reflex (or sometimes called tendon reflex) resulting from the extensor muscle being stretched. In upper motor neuron lesions, muscle tonus may increase and resistance of muscle to stretch increases. However, if sufficient force is applied, limb resistance suddenly decreases, presumably mediated by the Golgi tendon reflex (also call autogenic inhibition).

== Mechanism ==
This reflex is observed in patients with upper motor neuron lesions. It was frequently attributed to the action of the golgi tendon organ, likely because of early studies showing that tendon organs are activated by strong muscle stretch and inhibit motor neurons of the stretched muscle. It was thought that this was a protective reflex, preventing application of so much force that muscles become damaged. More recent work strongly suggests that tendon organs are not involved in the clasp knife reflex, but that other sensory receptors in muscles are responsible.

== Example ==
Passive flexion of elbow meets immediate resistance due to stretch reflex in the triceps muscle. Further stretch activates inverse stretch reflex. The resistance to flexion suddenly collapses, and the elbow flexes. Continued passive flexion stretches the muscle and the sequence may be repeated.

As the muscle tone increases, resistance against flexion of the limb increases as well. However, when flexion is continued, further stretching of the triceps muscle activates an inverse stretch reflex that relaxes the muscle due to autogenic inhibition.

== See also ==
- Hypertonia
