= Tendon reflex =

Reflexes in physiology

Tendon reflex (or T-reflex) may refer to:

- The stretch reflex or muscle stretch reflex (MSR), when the stretch is created by a blow upon a muscle tendon. This is the commonly used definition of the term. Albeit a misnomer, in this sense a common example is the standard patellar reflex or knee-jerk response. Stretch reflex tests are used to determine the integrity of the spinal cord and peripheral nervous system, and they can be used to determine the presence of a neuromuscular disease.

The term "deep tendon reflex", if it refers to the muscle stretch reflex, is a misnomer. "Tendons have little to do with the response, other than being responsible for mechanically transmitting the sudden stretch from the reflex hammer to the muscle spindle. In addition, some muscles with stretch reflexes have no tendons (e.g., "jaw jerk" of the masseter muscle)".

- The Golgi tendon reflex, which is a reflex to extensive tension on a tendon; it functions to protect musculoskeletal integrity. The sensory receptors for this reflex are anatomically located deep in the tendon, while the sensory receptors for the MSR are inside the muscle. Therefore, the Golgi tendon reflex can be referred to as the deep tendon reflex.

== Testing ==
As wrongfully referring to a muscle stretch reflex, to test the reflex, tap on the tendon. In a healthy individual the intensity on both sides is equal. This means that the connections between the spinal cord and the muscles are undamaged.

Main spinal nerve roots involved:

- Biceps (C5, C6)
- Brachioradialis (C6)
- Triceps (C7)
- Patellar (L4)
- Achilles tendon (S1)

== Functions of Golgi tendon reflex ==
The Golgi tendon reflex is a response to extensive tension on a tendon. It helps avoid strong muscle contractions which could tear the tendon from either the muscle or bone. In sports, quick movements can damage the tendon before the reflex can occur. The tendon reflex also helps spread the workload more evenly over the entire muscle by preventing "muscle fibers connected with overstimulated tendon organs so that their contraction is more comparable to the contraction of the rest of the muscle."
