= Upper motor neuron lesion =

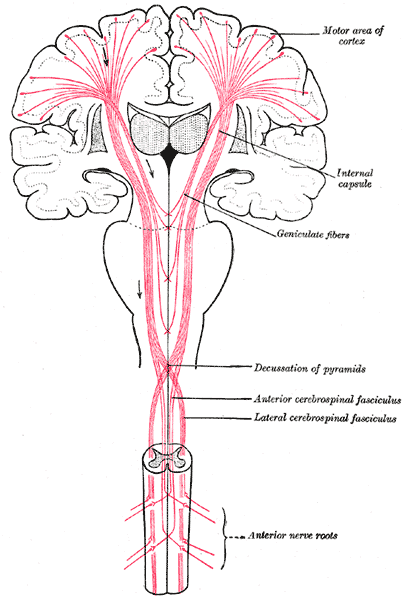
- The motor tract.
- Specialty: Neurology

An upper motor neuron lesion (also known as pyramidal insufficiency) Is an injury or abnormality that occurs in the neural pathway above the anterior horn cell of the spinal cord or motor nuclei of the cranial nerves. Conversely, a lower motor neuron lesion affects nerve fibers traveling from the anterior horn of the spinal cord or the cranial motor nuclei to the relevant muscle(s).

Upper motor neuron lesions occur in the brain or the spinal cord as the result of stroke, multiple sclerosis, traumatic brain injury, cerebral palsy, atypical parkinsonisms, multiple system atrophy, and amyotrophic lateral sclerosis.

== Symptoms ==
Changes in muscle performance can be broadly described as the upper motor neuron syndrome. These changes vary depending on the site and the extent of the lesion, and may include:

- Muscle weakness. known as 'pyramidal weakness'
- Sloth sign. Decreased control of active movement, particularly slowness
- Spasticity, a velocity-dependent change in muscle tone
- Clasp-knife response where initial higher resistance to movement is followed by a lesser resistance
- Babinski sign is present, where the big toe is raised (extended) rather than curled downwards (flexed) upon appropriate stimulation of the sole of the foot. The presence of the Babinski sign is an abnormal response in adulthood. Normally, during the plantar reflex, it causes plantar flexion and the adduction of the toes. In Babinski's sign, there is dorsiflexion of the big toe and abduction of the other toes. Physiologically, it is normally present in infants from birth to 12 months. The presence of the Babinski sign after 12 months is the sign of a non-specific upper motor neuron lesion.
- Increased deep tendon reflex (DTR)
- Pronator drift

== Corticospinal/pyramidal tract ==
These are the neural tracts which descend in the ventral horn of the spinal cord, carrying signals for voluntary movement of skeletal muscle. From their origin in the primary motor cortex, these nerves pass via the corona radiata to gather in the internal capsule before crossing over to the opposite side (decussation) in the medullary pyramids and proceeding down the spinal cord to meet lower motor neurons in the anterior grey column.

== Diagnosis ==
During an exam, your doctor will look for signs of a nervous system problem by checking your:

- Balance and coordination
- Movement
- Hearing, speech, and vision
- Memory and concentration

=== Tests for diagnosis ===
- Nerve conduction study
- Spinal tap or lumbar puncture
- Nerve biopsy

== Treatment ==
The treatment of an upper motor neuron lesion will be dependent on the underlying cause.

== See also ==
- Upper motor neuron
- Lower motor neuron
- Lower motor neuron lesion
