= Hypertonia =

Abnormal increase in muscle tone due to nerve damage

- Specialty: Neurology

Hypertonia is a term sometimes used synonymously with spasticity and rigidity in the literature surrounding damage to the central nervous system, namely upper motor neuron lesions. Impaired ability of damaged motor neurons to regulate descending pathways gives rise to disordered spinal reflexes, increased excitability of muscle spindles, and decreased synaptic inhibition. These consequences result in abnormally increased muscle tone of symptomatic muscles. Some authors suggest that the current definition for spasticity, the velocity-dependent overactivity of the stretch reflex, is not sufficient as it fails to take into account patients exhibiting increased muscle tone in the absence of stretch reflex over-activity. They instead suggest that "reversible hypertonia" is more appropriate and represents a treatable condition that is responsive to various therapy modalities like drug or physical therapy.

== Rigidity ==
Rigidity is characterized by increased resistance throughout the movement involving flexor and extensor muscles, which is different from spasticity involving single muscle compartment. Mainly 2 types of rigidity are described: Lead-pipe rigidity, which is uniform throughout the movement and Cogwheel rigidity, which is characterized by rhythmic interruption of the resistance, producing a wheel-like effect.

== Presentation ==
Symptoms associated with central nervous systems disorders are classified into positive and negative categories. Positive symptoms include those that increase muscle activity through hyper-excitability of the stretch reflex (i.e., rigidity and spasticity) where negative symptoms include those of insufficient muscle activity (i.e. weakness) and reduced motor function. Often the two classifications are thought to be separate entities of a disorder; however, some authors propose that they may be closely related.

== Pathophysiology ==
Characteristic features, analogy, and pathophysiology of common types of hypertonia. GTO – Golgi Tendon Organ

Hypertonia is caused by upper motor neuron lesions that may result from injury, disease, or conditions that involve damage to the central nervous system. The lack of or decrease in upper motor neuron function leads to loss of inhibition with resultant hyperactivity of lower motor neurons. Different patterns of muscle weakness or hyperactivity can occur based on the location of the lesion, causing a multitude of neurological symptoms, including spasticity, rigidity, or dystonia.

Spastic hypertonia involves uncontrollable muscle spasms, stiffening or straightening out of muscles, shock-like contractions of all or part of a group of muscles, and abnormal muscle tone. It is seen in disorders such as cerebral palsy, stroke, and spinal cord injury. Rigidity is a severe state of hypertonia where muscle resistance occurs throughout the entire range of motion of the affected joint independent of velocity. It is frequently associated with lesions of the basal ganglia. Individuals with rigidity present with stiffness, decreased range of motion, and loss of motor control. Rigidity is a nonselective increase in the tone of agonist and antagonist without velocity dependence, and the increased tone remains uniform throughout the range of movement. On the contrary, spasticity is a velocity-dependent increase in tone resulting from the hyper excitability of stretch reflexes. It primarily involves the antigravity muscles – flexors of the upper limb and extensors of the lower limb. During the passive stretch, a brief "free interval" is appreciated in spasticity but not in rigidity because the resting muscle is electromyographically silent in spasticity. In contrast, in rigidity, the resting muscle shows firing.

=== Physical interventions ===
Physiotherapy has been shown to be effective in controlling hypertonia through the use of stretching aimed to reduce motor neuron excitability. The aim of a physical therapy session could be to inhibit excessive tone as far as possible, give the patient a sensation of normal position and movement, and to facilitate normal movement patterns. While static stretch has been the classical means to increase range of motion, PNF stretching has been used in many clinical settings to effectively reduce muscle spasticity.

Icing and other topical anesthetics may decrease the reflexive activity for short period of time in order to facilitate motor function. Inhibitory pressure (applying firm pressure over muscle tendon) and promoting body heat retention and rhythmic rotation (slow repeated rotation of affected body part to stimulate relaxation) have also been proposed as potential methods to decrease hypertonia. Aside from static stretch casting, splinting techniques are extremely valuable to extend joint range of motion lost to hypertonicity. A more unconventional method for limiting tone is to deploy quick repeated passive movements to an involved joint in cyclical fashion; this approach has also been demonstrated to show results on persons without physical disabilities. For a more permanent state of improvement, exercise and patient education is imperative. Isokinetic, aerobic, and strength training exercises should be performed as prescribed by a physiotherapist, and stressful situations that may cause increased tone should be minimized or avoided.

=== Pharmaceutical interventions ===
Baclofen, diazepam, and dantrolene remain the three most commonly used pharmacologic agents in the treatment of spastic hypertonia. Baclofen is generally the drug of choice for spinal cord types of spasticity, while sodium dantrolene is the only agent which acts directly on muscle tissue. Tizanidine is also available. Phenytoin with chlorpromazine may be potentially useful if sedation does not limit their use. Ketazolam, not yet available in the United States, may be a significant addition to the pharmacologic set of options. Intrathecal administration of antispastic medications allows for high concentrations of drug near the site of action, which limits side effects.

== See also ==
- Dystonia
- Hypotonia
- Paratonia
- Spasticity
- Clasp-knife response
