= Upper motor neuron =

Neurons in the brain that carry signals to lower motor neurons

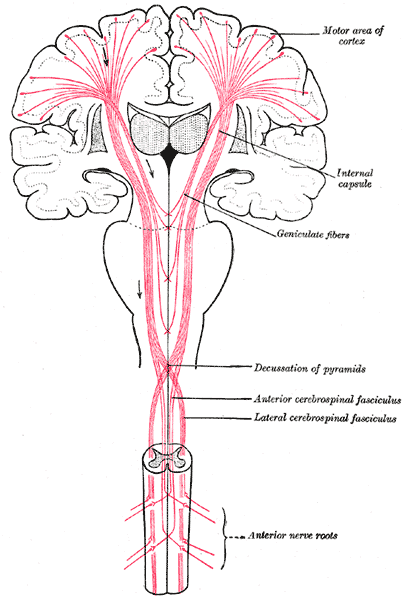
- The motor tract

Identifiers
- FMA: 84631

Upper motor neurons (UMNs) is a term introduced by William Gowers in 1886. They are found in the cerebral cortex and brainstem and carry information down to activate interneurons and lower motor neurons, which in turn directly signal muscles to contract or relax. UMNs represent the major origin point for voluntary somatic movement.

Upper motor neurons represent the largest pyramidal cells in the motor regions of the cerebral cortex. The major cell type of the UMNs is the Betz cells residing in layer V of the primary motor cortex, located on the precentral gyrus in the posterior frontal lobe. The cell bodies of Betz cell neurons are the largest in the brain, approaching nearly 0.1 mm in diameter. The axons of the upper motor neurons project out of the precentral gyrus travelling through to the brainstem, where they will decussate (intersect) within the lower medulla oblongata to form the lateral corticospinal tract on each side of the spinal cord. The fibers that do not decussate will pass through the medulla and continue on to form the anterior corticospinal tracts.

The upper motor neuron descends in the spinal cord to the level of the appropriate spinal nerve root. At this point, the upper motor neuron synapses with the lower motor neuron or interneurons within the ventral horn of the spinal cord, each of whose axons innervate a fiber of skeletal muscle.

These neurons connect the brain to the appropriate level in the spinal cord, from which point nerve signals continue to the muscles by means of the lower motor neurons. The neurotransmitter glutamate transmits the nerve impulses from upper to lower motor neurons, where it is detected by glutamate receptors.

== Pathways ==
Upper motor neurons travel in several neural pathways through the central nervous system (CNS):

Tract	Pathway	Function
corticospinal tract	from the motor cortex to lower motor neurons in the ventral horn of the spinal cord	The major function of this pathway is fine voluntary motor control of the limbs. The pathway also controls voluntary body posture adjustments.
corticobulbar tract	from the motor cortex to several nuclei in the pons and medulla oblongata	Involved in control of facial and jaw musculature, swallowing and tongue movements.
colliculospinal tract (tectospinal tract)	from the superior colliculus to lower motor neurons	Involved in involuntary adjustment of head position in response to visual information.
rubrospinal tract	from red nucleus to lower motor neurons	Involved in involuntary adjustment of arm position in response to balance information; support of the body.
vestibulospinal tract	from vestibular nuclei, which processes stimuli from semicircular canals	It is responsible for adjusting posture to maintain balance.
reticulospinal tract	from reticular formation	Regulates various involuntary motor activities and assists in balance.

== Lesions ==
Any upper motor neuron lesion, also known as pyramidal insufficiency, occurs in the neural pathway above the anterior horn of the spinal cord. Such lesions can arise as a result of stroke, multiple sclerosis, spinal cord injury or other acquired brain injury. The resulting changes in muscle performance that can be wide and varied are described overall as upper motor neuron syndrome. Symptoms can include muscle weakness, decreased motor control including a loss of the ability to perform fine movements, increased vigor (and decreased threshold) of spinal reflexes including spasticity, clonus (involuntary, successive cycles of contraction/relaxation of a muscle), and an extensor plantar response known as the Babinski sign.

== See also ==
- Lower motor neuron
- Upper motor neuron lesion
- Lower motor neuron lesion
