= Muscle tone =

Continuous and passive partial contraction of the muscles

In physiology, medicine, and anatomy, muscle tone (residual muscle tension or tonus) is the continuous and passive partial contraction of the muscles, or the muscle's resistance to passive stretch during resting state. It helps to maintain posture and declines during REM sleep. Muscle tone is regulated by the activity of the motor neurons and can be affected by various factors, including age, disease, and nerve damage.

== Purpose ==
If a sudden pull or stretch occurs, the body responds by automatically increasing the muscle's tension, a reflex which helps guard against danger as well as helping maintain balance. Such near-continuous innervation can be thought of as a "default" or "steady state" condition for muscles. Both the extensor and flexor muscles are involved in the maintenance of a constant tone while at rest. In skeletal muscles, this helps maintain a normal posture.

Resting muscle tone varies along a bell-shaped curve. Low tone is perceived as "lax, flabby, floppy, mushy, dead weight" and high tone is perceived as "tight, light, strong". Muscles with high tone are not necessarily strong and muscles with low tone are not necessarily weak. In general, low tone does increase flexibility and decrease strength, and high tone does decrease flexibility and increase strength, but with many exceptions. A person with low tone will most likely not be able to engage in "explosive" movement such as needed in a sprinter or high jumper. These athletes usually have high tone that is within normal limits. A person with high tone will usually not be flexible in activities such as dance and yoga. Joint laxity contributes greatly to flexibility, especially with flexibility in one or a few areas, instead of overall flexibility.

For example, a person can be high tone with normal to poor flexibility in most areas, but be able to put the palms of the hands on the floor with straight knees due to hypermobile sacroiliac joints. It is important to assess several areas before deciding if a person has high, low, or normal muscle tone.

== Pathological tonus ==
Physical disorders can result in abnormally low (hypotonia) or high (hypertonia) muscle tone. Another form of hypertonia is paratonia, which is associated with dementia. Hypotonia is seen in lower motor neuron disease like poliomyelitis. Hypotonia can present clinically as muscle flaccidity, where the limbs appear floppy, stretch reflex responses are decreased, and the limb's resistance to passive movement is also decreased. Hypertonia is seen in upper motor neuron diseases like lesions in pyramidal tract and extrapyramidal tract. Hypertonia can present clinically as either spasticity or rigidity. While spasticity is velocity-dependent resistance to passive stretch (e.g., passively moving an elbow quickly will elicit increased muscle tone, but passively moving elbow slowly may not elicit increased muscle tone), rigidity is velocity-independent resistance to passive stretch (i.e. there is uniform increased tone whether the elbow is passively moved quickly or slowly). Spasticity can be in the form of the clasp-knife response, in which there is increased resistance only at the beginning or at the end of the movement. Rigidity can be of the leadpipe type, in which there is resistance throughout to passive movement, or it may be of cogwheel type, in which the resistance to passive movement is in a jerky manner.

=== Tonus in surgery ===
In ophthalmology, tonus may be a central consideration in eye surgery, as in the manipulation of extraocular muscles to repair strabismus. Tonicity aberrations are associated with many diseases of the eye (e.g. Adie syndrome).

=== Cramps ===
Normally, people are unaware of their muscle tone in their daily activities. The body maintains the balance between the tone of flexor and extensor muscle groups. Sometimes, in normal, healthy people, that tone is lost either in flexors or extensor muscle groups in isolation, temporarily and intermittently resulting in muscle cramps. Treating these extensor or flexor group of muscles in isolation can be difficult. Generally, muscle relaxants or quinine can help with cramps and is warranted when they become troublesome. But these medications cause their relaxing effect in both groups by moderating their tone. The cause of disproportionate intermittent contractions of either flexors or extensors or the cause of cramps is unknown. The stimulus for muscle cramps may originate in the cerebral cortex, the spinal cord, or the muscle itself. This could indicate developing pathology or other problems in the future.

== See also ==
- Muscle weakness
