= Cranial nerve nucleus =

Collection of neurons in the brain stem

- The cranial nerve nuclei schematically represented; dorsal view. Motor nuclei in red; sensory in blue. (The olfactory and optic centers are not represented.)

Details

Identifiers
- Latin: nucleus nervi cranialis
- NeuroLex ID: nlx_28532
- TA98: A14.1.00.004
- TA2: 5857
- FMA: 54501

A cranial nerve nucleus is a collection of neuron cell bodies (gray matter) in the brain stem that is associated with one or more of the cranial nerves. Axons carrying information to and from the cranial nerves form a synapse first at these nuclei. Lesions occurring at these nuclei can lead to effects resembling those seen by the severing of nerve(s) they are associated with. All the nuclei except that of the trochlear nerve (CN IV) supply nerves of the same side of the body.

== Structure ==
=== Motor and sensory ===
In general, motor nuclei are closer to the front (ventral), and sensory nuclei and neurons are closer to the back (dorsal). This arrangement mirrors the arrangement of tracts in the spinal cord.

- Close to the midline are the motor efferent nuclei, such as the oculomotor nucleus, which control skeletal muscle. Just lateral to this are the autonomic (or visceral) efferent nuclei.
- There is a separation, called the sulcus limitans, and lateral to this are the sensory nuclei. Near the sulcus limitans are the visceral afferent nuclei, namely the solitary tract nucleus.
- More lateral, but also less posterior, are the general somatic afferent nuclei. This is the trigeminal nucleus. Back at the dorsal surface of the brainstem, and more lateral are the special somatic afferents, this handles sensation such as balance.
- Another area, not on the dorsum of the brainstem, is where the special visceral efferents nuclei reside. These formed from the pharyngeal arches, in the embryo. This area is a bit below the autonomic motor nuclei, and includes the nucleus ambiguus, facial nerve nucleus, as well as the motor part of the trigeminal nerve nucleus.

=== Location ===
This list documents nuclei by the part of the brain they are found in:

Nuclei present in the Midbrain
- Red nucleus - motor, extrapyramidal
- Trochlear nucleus (IV) - motor
- Oculomotor nucleus (III) - motor
- Edinger-Westphal nucleus (III) - visceromotor
Nuclei present in the Pons
- Cochlear nuclei (VIII) - sensory
  - Dorsal cochlear nucleus
  - Ventral cochlear nucleus
- Vestibular nuclei (VIII) - sensory
- Salivary nuclei - visceromotor
  - Inferior salivary nucleus (IX)
  - Superior salivary nucleus (VII)
- Facial nucleus (VII) - motor
- Abducens nucleus (VI) - motor
- Trigeminal motor nucleus (V) - motor
- Main trigeminal nucleus (V) - sensory (fine touch and vibration)
Nuclei present in the medulla

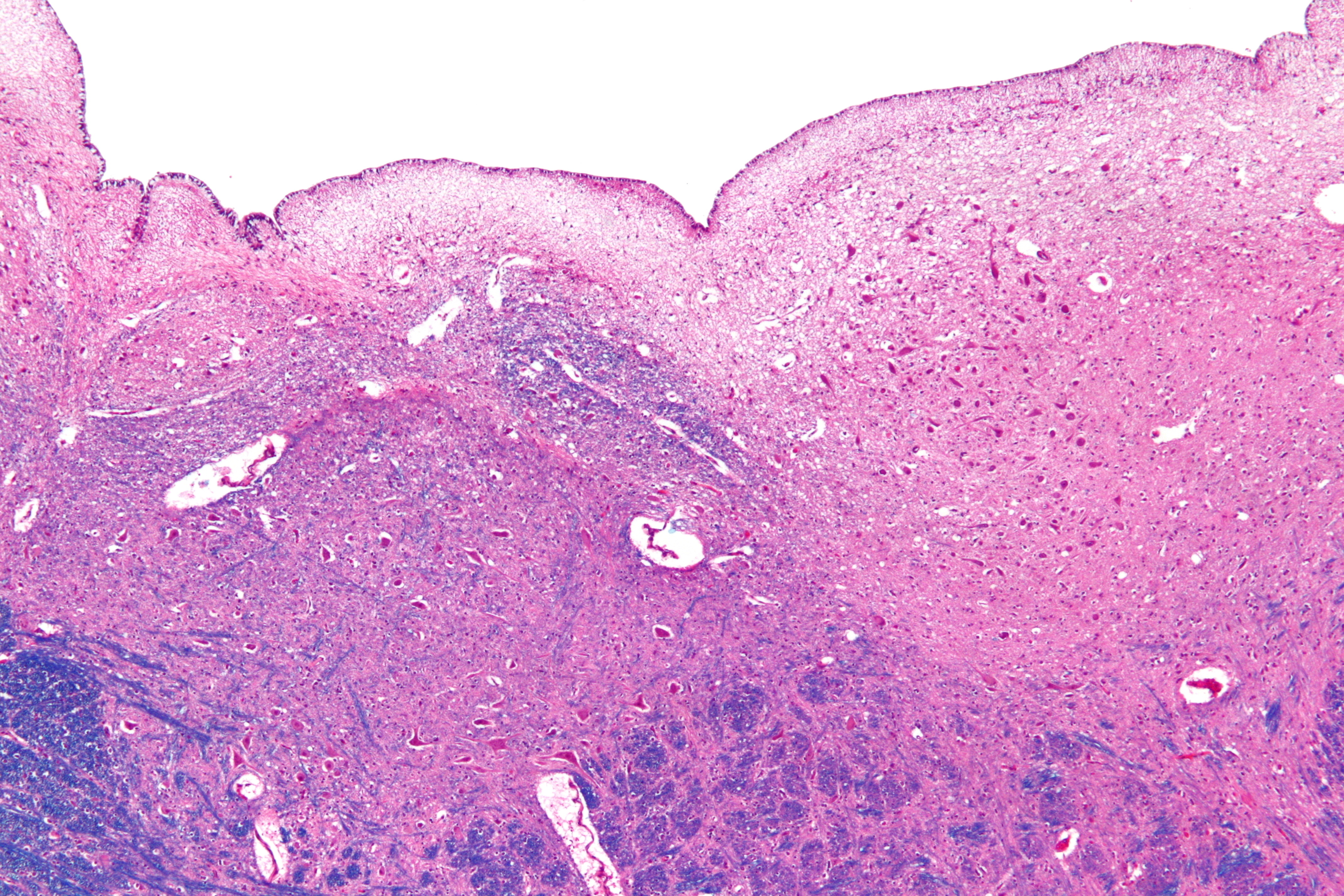
Micrograph of the posterior portion of the open part of the medulla oblongata, showing the fourth ventricle (top of image) and the hypoglossal nucleus (medial - left of image) and the dorsal motor nucleus of the vagus nerve (lateral - right of image). H&E-LFB stain.

- Hypoglossal nucleus (XII) - motor
- Dorsal motor nucleus of vagus nerve (X) - visceromotor
- Nucleus ambiguus (IX, X, XI) - motor
- Solitary nucleus (VII, IX, X) - sensory
- Spinal trigeminal nucleus (V) - sensory (crude touch, temperature and pain)
- Inferior olivary nucleus afferent fibres to cerebellum

== Location ==
Nuclei of the cranial nerves
Olfactory nerve	Olfactory bulb
Optic nerve	Lateral geniculate nucleus
Oculomotor nerve	Oculomotor nucleus Edinger-Westphal nucleus
Trochlear nerve	Trochlear nucleus
Trigeminal nerve	Trigeminal nerve nuclei: Mesencephalic nucleus Principal sensory nucleus Spinal trigeminal nucleus Trigeminal motor nucleus
Abducens nerve	Abducens nucleus
Facial nerve	Facial motor nucleus Superior salivatory nucleus Solitary nucleus
Vestibulocochlear nerve	Vestibular nuclei w. subnuclei Cochlear nucleus w. subnuclei
Glossopharyngeal nerve	Solitary nucleus Spinal nucleus of the trigeminal nerve Lateral nucleus of vagal trigone. Nucleus ambiguus Inferior salivatory nucleus
Vagus nerve	Dorsal nucleus of vagus nerve Nucleus ambiguus Solitary nucleus Spinal trigeminal nucleus
Accessory nerve	Spinal accessory nucleus Nucleus ambiguus
Hypoglossal nerve	Hypoglossal nucleus

== Additional images ==
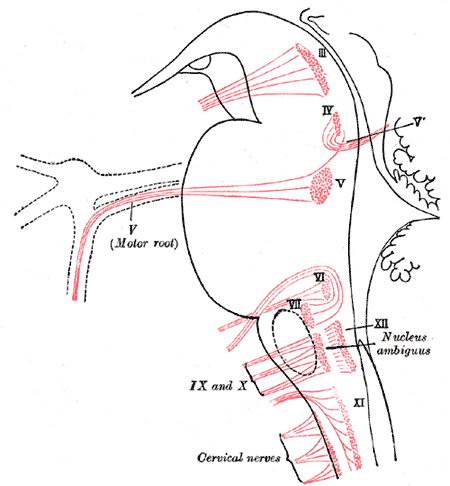
Nuclei of origin of cranial motor nerves schematically represented; lateral view.

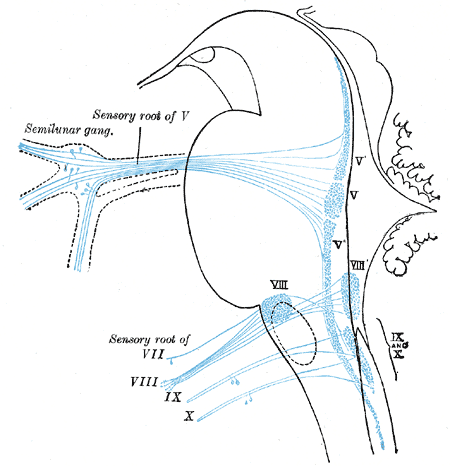
Primary terminal nuclei of the afferent (sensory) cranial nerves schematically represented; lateral view.

Brain stem sagittal section
