= Trigeminocerebellar fibers =

Identifiers
- NeuroNames: 1428

The trigeminocerebellar fibers are fibers in the inferior cerebellar peduncles which transmit proprioceptive information from the face to the cerebellum. This information originates in proprioceptors (e.g. muscle spindles) in the face. Primary cell bodies are in the mesencephalic nucleus of the trigeminal nerve. These fibers transmit information to secondary afferent cell bodies in the oralis and interpolaris portions of the spinal trigeminal nucleus plus the principal nucleus. Axons from the spinal nucleus (and a smaller number from the principal nucleus) then form the trigeminocerebellar tract and ascend to the cerebellum.
