= Trigeminal lemniscus =

Nerve tract

Details

Identifiers
- Latin: lemniscus trigeminalis
- NeuroNames: 1572
- TA98: A14.1.05.310; A14.1.08.680; A14.1.06.208
- TA2: 5862
- FMA: 84040

The trigeminal lemniscus or the trigeminothalamic tracts is a somatosensory tract containing second-order neuron fibers of the trigeminal system. It consists of the ventral and dorsal trigeminal tracts. Its second-order sensory axons convey tactile, pain, and temperature impulses from the skin of the face, the mucous membranes of the nasal and oral cavities, and the eye, as well as proprioceptive information from the facial and masticatory muscles.

It terminates by synapsing with third-order neurons in the ventral posteromedial nucleus of the thalamus.

This tract was historically considered a cephalic division of the medial lemniscus due to the close proximity of the two ascending tracts. Like the medial lemniscus in the dorsal column-medial lemniscus pathway (DCML), that carries mechanosensory information from part of the head and the rest of the body, the trigeminal lemniscus carries mechanosensory information from the face. However, the trigeminal lemniscus also carries pain and temperature sensations from the contralateral orofacial region, just as the spinothalamic tract carries these sensations from the contralateral body. Thus, the trigeminal lemniscus of the head is functionally analogous to both the DCML tracts and the spinothalamic tract of the body.

== Divisions ==
The trigeminal lemniscus contains two main divisions:

- The ventral trigeminal tract - consists of second-order axons from the spinal trigeminal nucleus. These fibers cross the midline and ascend to the contralateral thalamus.
- The dorsal trigeminal tract - consists of second-order axons from the principal sensory nucleus of trigeminal nerve. These fibers do not cross the midline, and ascend to the ipsilateral thalamus.

== Sources ==
- Anthoney, T. R. (1993). Neuroanatomy and the neurologic exam: a thesaurus of synonyms, similar-sounding non-synonyms, and terms of variable meaning. CRC Press.
- Snell, R. S. (2010). Clinical neuroanatomy. Lippincott Williams & Wilkins.
- Miller MW, Muller SJ. Structure and histogenesis of the principal sensory nucleus of the trigeminal nerve: effects of prenatal exposure to ethanol. J Comp Neurol. 1989;282:570–580
