= Brown–Vialetto–Van Laere syndrome =

- Other names: BVVLS1

Brown-Vialetto-Van Laere syndrome (BVVL), is a rare, progressive, inherited neurodegenerative disorder that most often manifests in infancy or early childhood. Since 2010, mutations in the SLC52A1, SLC52A2, or SLC52A3 genes, which encode riboflavin transporters, have been identified as the cause of BVVL. BVVL is now known as riboflavin transporter deficiency (RTD, OMIM 614707).

RTD types 2 and 3 are characterized by a diverse phenotypic spectrum encompassing motor, sensory, and cranial nerve neuropathies, leading to sensorineural hearing loss, optic atrophy, sensory ataxia, muscle weakness, ponto-bulbar palsy, and respiratory insufficiency. Without treatment, individuals with RTD types 2 and 3 experience severe disability and a rapidly progressive disease course, often culminating in fatal respiratory failure, particularly in those with early infancy onset.

Oral riboflavin supplementation has emerged as a life-saving treatment, significantly improving outcomes across multiple functional domains and slowing disease progression. Since 2010, approximately one hundred genetically confirmed cases of RTD have been reported in the literature, all of which were treated with high-dose oral riboflavin supplementation.

== Symptoms and signs ==
BVVL is marked by a number of cranial nerve palsies, including those of the motor components involving the 7th and 9th-12th cranial nerves, spinal motor nerves, and upper motor neurons. Major features of BVVL include facial and neck weakness, fasciculation of the tongue, and neurological disorders from the cranial nerves. The neurological manifestations develop insidiously: they usually begin with sensorineural deafness, progress inexorably to paralysis, and often culminate in respiratory failure. Most mortality in patients has been from either respiratory infections or respiratory muscle paralysis. Pathological descriptions of BVVL include injury and depletion of 3rd-7th cranial nerves, loss of the spinal anterior horn cells, degeneration of Purkinje cells, as well as degeneration of the spinocerebellar and pyramidal tracts. The first symptoms in nearly all cases of BVVL is progressive vision loss and deafness, and the first initial symptoms are seen anywhere from one to three years.

Most cases of deafness are followed by a latent period that can extend anywhere from weeks to years, and this time is usually marked by cranial nerve degeneration. Neurological symptoms of BVVL include optic atrophy, cerebellar ataxia, retinitis pigmentosa, epilepsy and autonomic dysfunction.

== Genetics ==
BVVL has autosomal recessive pattern of inheritance

The disorder has been associated with various mutations in the SLC52A2 and SLC52A3 genes. This gene is thought to be involved in transport of riboflavin.

== Diagnosis ==
Diagnosis requires a neurological examination and neuroimaging can be helpful. Genetic testing is able to identify genetic mutations underlying BVVL.

BVVL can be differentially diagnosed from similar conditions like Fazio-Londe syndrome and amyotrophic lateral sclerosis, in that those two conditions don't involve sensorineural hearing loss, while BVVL, Madras motor neuron disease, Nathalie syndrome, and Boltshauser syndrome do. Nathalie syndrome does not involve lower cranial nerve symptoms, so it can be excluded if those are present. If there is evidence of lower motor neuron involvement, Boltshauser syndrome can be excluded. Finally, if there is a family history of the condition, then BVVL is more likely than MMND, as MMND tends to be sporadic.

== Treatment ==
As of 2017, there were case reports that treatment with high doses of riboflavin 5 phosphate can halt the progress of Brown–Vialetto–Van Laere syndrome and in some cases can improve symptoms.

The first report of BVVL syndrome in Japanese literature was of a woman that had BVVL and showed improvement after such treatments. The patient was a sixty-year-old woman who had symptoms such as sensorineural deafness, weakness, and atrophy since she was 15 years old. Around the age of 49 the patient was officially diagnosed with BVVL, intubated, and then attached to a respirator to improve her CO₂ narcosis. After the treatments, the patient still required respiratory assistance during sleep; however, the patient no longer needed assistance by a respirator during the daytime.

== Prognosis ==
The clinical course of BVVL can vary from one patient to another. There have been cases with progressive deterioration, deterioration followed by periods of stabilization, and deterioration with abrupt periods of increasing severity.

The syndrome has previously been considered to have a high mortality rate but the initial response of most patients to the riboflavin protocol are very encouraging and seem to indicate a significantly improved life expectancy could be achievable. There are three documented cases of BVVL where the patient died within the first five years of the disease. On the contrary, most patients have survived more than 10 years after the onset of their first symptom, and several cases have survived 20–30 years after the onset of their first symptom.

Families with multiple cases of BVVL and, more generally, multiple cases of infantile progressive bulbar palsy can show variability in age of disease onset and survival. Dipti and Childs described such a situation in which a family had five children that had Infantile PBP. In this family, three siblings showed sensorineural deafness and other symptoms of BVVL at an older age. The other two siblings showed symptoms of Fazio-Londe disease and died before the age of two.

== Epidemiology ==
Between 2010 and 2024, the Cure RTD Patient Registry documented over 400 patients with genetically confirmed RTD. This includes, ~200 individuals with RTD type 2 and ~200 individuals with RTD type 3, of which over 200 are reported in the literature. Approximately 59% of reported patients are females.

== History ==
The syndrome was first described by Charles Brown in 1894; further accounts by Vialetto and Van Laere followed in 1936 and 1966, respectively. The connection between the syndrome and riboflavin-transporting genes was first demonstrated in 2010, which led to the term "riboflavin transporter deficiency" emerging as an alternative name for the disorder.

== See also ==
- Fazio–Londe disease
