= Fazio–Londe disease =

- Other names: Progressive bulbar palsy of childhood
- This condition has an autosomal recessive mode of inheritance
- Specialty: Neurology

Fazio–Londe disease (FLD), also called progressive bulbar palsy of childhood, is a very rare inherited motor neuron disease of children and young adults and is characterized by progressive paralysis of muscles innervated by cranial nerves. FLD, along with Brown–Vialetto–Van Laere syndrome (BVVL), are the two forms of infantile progressive bulbar palsy, a type of progressive bulbar palsy in children.

== Signs and symptoms ==
FLD produces rapidly progressive weakness of tongue, face and pharyngeal muscles in a clinical pattern similar to myasthenia. Neuromuscular transmission may be abnormal in these muscles because of rapid denervation and immature reinnervation. Paralysis occurs secondary to degeneration of the motor neurons of the brain stem. It causes progressive bulbar paralysis due to involvement of motor neurons of the cranial nerve nuclei. The most frequent symptoms at onset of progressive bulbar paralysis of childhood has been a unilateral facial paralysis. It is followed in frequency by dysarthria due to facial weakness or by dysphagia. Palatal weakness and palpebral ptosis also have been reported in few patients. Both sexes can be affected.

== Genetics ==
Fazio–Londe disease is linked to a genetic mutation in the SLC52A3 gene on chromosome 20 (locus: 20p13). It is allelic and phenotypically similar to Brown–Vialetto–Van Laere syndrome. The condition is inherited in an autosomal recessive manner. The gene encodes the intestinal riboflavin transporter (hRFT2).

== Diagnosis ==
Symptoms of Fazio–Londe include bulbar palsy, hearing loss, facial weakness, and difficulty breathing. The disease is caused by mutations in the SLC52A2 gene and the SLC52A1 (GPR172B) genes which code for hRFT3 and hRFT1, human riboflavin transporters. Only muscle biopsy and examination of the transporter genes is considered to provide a definitive diagnosis. However, because the disease is so often fatal without treatment, and because the treatment is so inexpensive and with little risk, it is recommended that if the disease is suspected that riboflavin therapy be started immediately while testing is in progress.

== Treatment ==
The condition is treatable. High doses of oral riboflavin 5 phosphate may work, and sublingual flavin adenine dinucleotide may work.

== Prognosis ==
Onset of first symptom has been reported between 1–12 years, with a mean age of onset at 8 years. Clinical course can be divided into early (< 6 yrs age, predominance of respiratory symptoms) and late course (6–20 years of age, predominance of motor symptoms on superior limbs). Progression to involve other cranial nerve muscles occurs over a period of months or years. In the Gomez review, the facial nerve was affected in all cases while the hypoglossal nerve was involved in all cases except one. Other cranial nerves involved were vagus, trigeminal, spinal accessory nerve, abducens, oculomotor, and glossopharyngeal in this order. Corticospinal tract signs were found in 2 of the 14 patients.

The disease may progress to patient's death in a period as short as 9 months or may have a slow evolution or may show plateaus. Postmortem examination of cases have found depletion of nerve cells in the nuclei of cranial nerves. The histologic alterations found in patient with Fazio–Londe disease were identical to those seen in infantile-onset spinal muscular atrophy.

Strength may improve with administration of cholinesterase inhibitors.

== History ==
Berger, in 1876, first reported a case of 12-year-old boy with progressive bulbar paralysis. His medical history revealed a neurological illness with difficulty in swallowing liquids and solids, nasal regurgitation to liquids, nasal twang 2 years ago. He was treated for post-diphtheritic bulbar palsy and had a residual bulbar weakness. Other details were not available. The child was ambulant and apparently normal until 3 months back when he developed respiratory distress and was treated at a local hospital prior to referral. He had a past history of dog bite 3 months ago for which he received five doses of anti-rabies vaccine. He was born out of a non-consanguineous marriage. The antenatal, natal, postnatal histories were insignificant. His elder sibling was healthy. This child was immunised appropriate for age. There was no family history of any neurological illness or sibling death.

== Eponym ==
It is named for the Italian pathologist Eugenio Fazio (1849–1902) and the French physician Paul Frederic Louis Londe (1864–1944).
