= Trigeminal nerve nuclei =

Largest of the cranial nerve nuclei

- The cranial nerve nuclei schematically represented; dorsal view. Motor nuclei in red; sensory in blue. (Trigeminal nerve nuclei are at "V".)

Details

Identifiers
- Latin: nuclei trigemini
- MeSH: D014278
- NeuroNames: 2021
- NeuroLex ID: nifext_11
- FMA: 71248

The sensory trigeminal nerve nuclei are the largest of the cranial nerve nuclei, and extend through the whole of the midbrain, pons and medulla, and into the upper cervical spinal cord.

The nucleus is divided into three parts, from rostral to caudal (top to bottom in humans):

- The mesencephalic nucleus
- The principal sensory nucleus
- The spinal trigeminal nucleus

The spinal trigeminal nucleus is further subdivided into three parts, from rostral to caudal:

- Pars oralis (from the Pons to the Hypoglossal nucleus)
- Pars interpolaris (from the Hypoglossal nucleus to the obex)
- Pars caudalis (from the obex to C2)

There is also a distinct trigeminal motor nucleus that is medial to the principal sensory nucleus.

== See also ==
- Photic sneeze reflex
- Trigeminal nerve

== Additional images ==
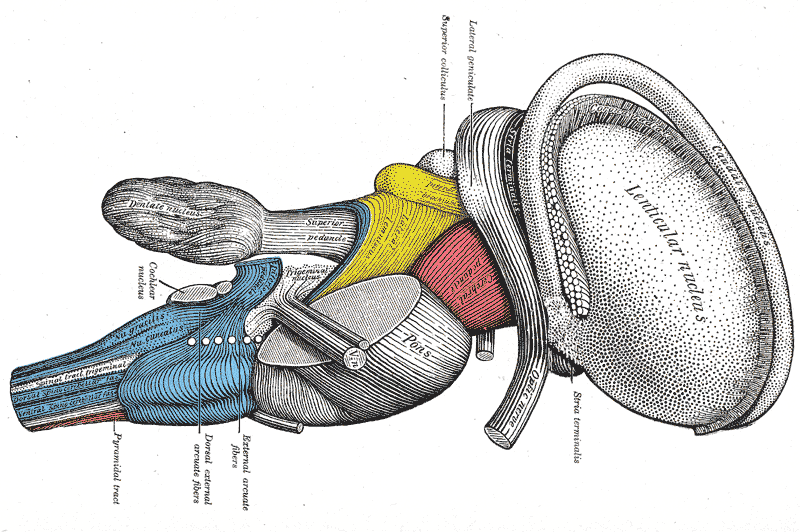
Dissection of brain-stem. Lateral view.

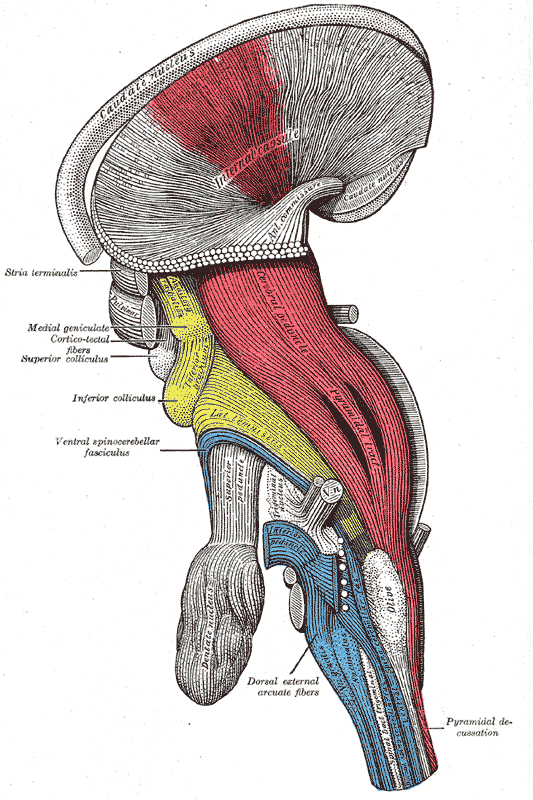
Deep dissection of brain-stem. Lateral view.

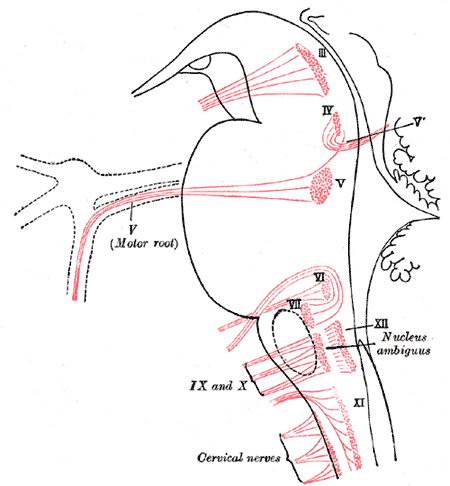
Nuclei of origin of cranial motor nerves schematically represented; lateral view.

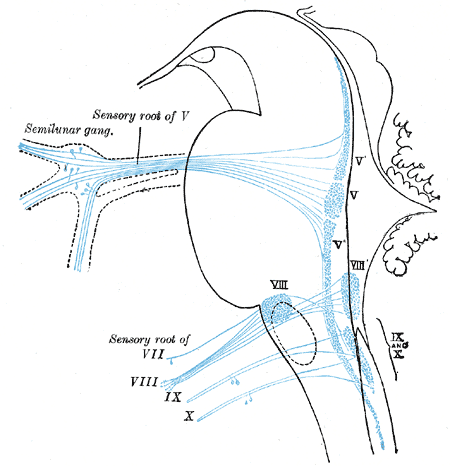
Primary terminal nuclei of the afferent (sensory) cranial nerves schematically represented; lateral view.
