= Madras motor neuron disease =

- Other names: MMND
- Specialty: Neurology

Madras motor neuron disease is a rare motor neuron disease originating in South India. Two other forms of the disease have been found, Familial Madras Motor Neuron Disease (FMMND) and the variant Madras Motor Neuron Disease (MMNDV). The symptoms of MMND include weakness in the arms and legs, loss of vision, and deafness. Most affected individuals are diagnosed by the age of 15 and occurs at the same frequency in males and females. While the cause of the disease and its origins are not yet known, supportive care is available to individuals affected by the disease.

== Symptoms and signs ==
Symptoms of MMND begin appearing when people are young, often before the age of 15. An affected individual is generally thin with weak arms and legs. They may lose control of the muscles that control their face, mouth, nose, and throat. This in turn, will cause difficulties speaking and swallowing. Further complications from the loss of facial motor control include drooling, as well facial droop. People with MMND may also suffer from a loss of hearing and sight.

== Causes ==
The cause of MMND has not yet been determined. There are cases where MMND appears to be inherited. However, no relevant genes have been identified.

MMND affects many cranial nerves, particularly involving the 7th (facial nerve) and 9th to the 12th cranial nerves (in order: glossopharyngeal nerve, vagus nerve, accessory nerve, spinal accessory nerve).

Brain human normal inferior view with labels en

== Diagnosis ==
Diagnosis requires a neurological examination. A neuroimaging exam can also be helpful for diagnosis. For example, an MRI can be used to discover the atrophy of the specific brain regions.

MMND can be differentially diagnosed from similar conditions like Fazio-Londe syndrome and amyotrophic lateral sclerosis, in that those two conditions don't involve sensorineural hearing loss, while MMND, Brown-Vialetto-Van Laere syndrome (BVVLS), Nathalie syndrome, and Boltshauser syndrome do. Nathalie syndrome does not involve lower cranial nerve symptoms, so it can be excluded if those are present. If there is evidence of lower motor neuron involvement, Boltshauser syndrome can be excluded. Finally, if there is a family history of the condition, then BVVLS is more likely, as MMND tends to be sporadic.

=== Classification ===
Madras motor neuron disease (MMND) is a motor neuron disease affecting primarily lower motor neurons. It is similar to Monomelic amyotrophy and primarily affects young adults in southern India.

Authors of a large case study, published in 2008, proposed that MMND be divided into two categories: spontaneously-arising MMND and Familial Madras Motor Neuron Disease (FMMND). Using this method, cases in which the disease is inherited would be categorized as FMMND, while cases that displayed no genetic linkage would be categorized as spontaneously-arising MMND.

According to the same study, there is a variant form known as MMNDV, which is classified by additional optic atrophy.

Due to the rareness of MMND, it is classified as an orphan disease.

== Management ==
As of 2010, there was no cure for MMND. People with MMND are given supportive care to help them cope, which can include physical therapy, occupational therapy, counselling, speech and swallowing therapy, and hearing aids.

== Prognosis ==
People with MMND become progressively more weak with time. Generally, affected individuals survive up to 30 years after they are diagnosed.

== Epidemiology ==
As of 2008 under 200 cases have been reported worldwide. The disease affects males and females in equal rates. Most cases have arisen in Southern India in the states of Andhra Pradesh, Karnataka, Kerala and Tamil Nadu, with others being reported in parts of Asia as well as Italy.

== History ==
Madras motor neuron disease was first described by Meenakshisundaram et al. in Chennai in 1970.

Map of India

== Research ==
A 2008 paper presented a study of 116 cases, observed over 36 years. The authors looked at the family trees of people with MMND, and found evidence for autosomal recessive inheritance in 15 of the 16 families studied, and autosomal dominant inheritance in the other. They also described postmortem studies of people with MMND, and found that the spinal cord had extreme loss of anterior horn cells and demyelination and sclerosis of the ventrolateral columns; which could explain peripheral weakness, paresthesias, or paralysis. They also found changes in the color of the myelin of the optic nerves, decreases in Purkinje cells, increase in Bergman glia, demyelination of fibers around the dentate nucleus with gliosis, swollen globular neurons of deep nuclei of the cerebellum, neural depletion and gliosis of the cochlear nucleus on both sides of the brainstem, and demyelination and axonal loss of the cochlear nerve. The authors said that the consistent findings of gliosis shows that inflammation in central nervous system is a key factor in how the disease harms people.
