= Pseudobulbar palsy =

Inability to control facial movements

- Specialty: Neurology

Pseudobulbar palsy is a medical condition characterized by the inability to control facial movements (such as chewing and speaking) and caused by a variety of neurological disorders. Patients experience difficulty chewing and swallowing, have increased reflexes and spasticity in tongue and the bulbar region, and demonstrate slurred speech (which is often the initial presentation of the disorder), sometimes also demonstrating uncontrolled emotional outbursts.

The condition is usually caused by the bilateral damage to corticobulbar pathways, which are upper motor neuron pathways that course from the cerebral cortex to nuclei of cranial nerves in the brain stem.

== Signs and symptoms ==
Signs and symptoms of pseudobulbar palsy include:

- Slow and indistinct speech
- Dysphagia (difficulty in swallowing)
- Small, stiff and spastic tongue
- Brisk jaw jerk
- Dysarthria
- Labile affect
- Gag reflex may be normal, exaggerated or absent
- Examination may reveal upper motor neuron lesion of the limbs

== Causes ==
Pseudobulbar palsy is the result of damage of motor fibers traveling from the cerebral cortex to the lower brain stem. This damage might arise in the course of a variety of neurological conditions that involve demyelination and bilateral corticobulbar lesions. Examples include:

- Progressive supranuclear palsy
- Amyotrophic lateral sclerosis
- Parkinson's disease and related multiple system atrophy
- Various motor neuron diseases, especially those involving demyelination
- Multiple sclerosis and other inflammatory disorders
- Vascular lesions
- High brain stem tumors
- Metabolic causes: osmotic demyelination syndrome
- Neurological involvement in Behçet's disease
- Brain trauma

== Pathophysiology ==
The proposed mechanism of pseudobulbar palsy points to the disinhibition of the motor neurons controlling laughter and crying, proposing that a reciprocal pathway exists between the cerebellum and the brain stem that adjusts laughter and crying responses, making them appropriate to context. The pseudobulbar crying could also be induced by stimulation in the region of the subthalamic nucleus of the brain.

== Diagnosis ==
Diagnosis of pseudobulbar palsy is based on observation of the symptoms of the condition. Tests examining jaw jerk and gag reflex can also be performed. It has been suggested that the majority of patients with pathological laughter and crying have pseudobulbar palsy due to bilateral corticobulbar lesions and often a bipyramidal involvement of arms and legs. To further confirm the condition, MRI can be performed to define the areas of brain abnormality.

== Treatment ==
Since pseudobulbar palsy is a syndrome associated with other diseases, treating the underlying disease may eventually reduce the symptoms of pseudobulbar palsy.

Possible pharmacological interventions for pseudobulbar affect include the tricyclic antidepressants, serotonin reuptake inhibitors, and a novel approach utilizing dextromethorphan and quinidine sulfate. Nuedexta is an FDA approved medication for pseudobulbar affect. Dextromethorphan, an N-methyl-D-aspartate receptor antagonist, inhibits glutamatergic transmission in the regions of the brainstem and cerebellum, which are hypothesized to be involved in pseudobulbar symptoms, and acts as a sigma ligand, binding to the sigma-1 receptors that mediate the emotional motor expression.

== See also ==
- Corticobulbar tract
- Bulbar palsy, a similar syndrome caused by the damage of lower motor neurons.
- Motor neuron disease
