= Progressive bulbar palsy =

- Specialty: Neurology

Progressive bulbar palsy (PBP) is a medical condition. It belongs to a group of disorders known as motor neuron diseases. PBP is a disease that attacks the nerves supplying the bulbar muscles. These disorders are characterized by the degeneration of motor neurons in the cerebral cortex, spinal cord, brain stem, and pyramidal tracts. This specifically involves the glossopharyngeal nerve (IX), vagus nerve (X), and hypoglossal nerve (XII).

This disorder should not be confused with pseudobulbar palsy or progressive spinal muscular atrophy. The term infantile progressive bulbar palsy is used to describe progressive bulbar palsy in children. The ICD-11 lists progressive bulbar palsy as a variant of amyotrophic lateral sclerosis (ALS).

== Signs and symptoms ==
Prognosis for PBP patients is poor. Progressive bulbar palsy symptoms can include progressive difficulty with talking and swallowing. Patients can also exhibit reduced gag reflexes, weak palatal movements, fasciculations, and weak movement of the facial muscles and tongue. In advanced cases of PBP, patients may be unable to protrude their tongue or manipulate food in their mouth.

Patients with early cases of PBP have difficulty with pronunciations, particularly lateral consonants (linguals) and velars, and may show problems with drooling saliva. If the corticobulbar tract is affected a pseudobulbar affect with emotional changes may occur. Because PBP patients have such difficulty swallowing, food and saliva can be inhaled into the lungs. This can cause gagging and choking, and it increases the risk of pneumonia. Death, which is often from pneumonia, usually occurs one to three years after the start of the disorder.

About twenty-five percent of patients with PBP eventually develop the widespread symptoms common to ALS.

== Cause ==
The cause of PBP is unknown. One form of PBP is found to occur within patients that have a CuZn-superoxide dismutase (SOD1) mutation. Progressive bulbar palsy patients that have this mutation are classified with FALS patients, Familial ALS (FALS) accounts for about 5–10% of all ALS cases and is caused by genetic factors. Within these, about 20–25% are linked to the SOD1 mutation. It is not currently known if and how the decreased SOD1 activity contributes to Progressive Bulbar Palsy or FALS, and studies are being done in patients and transgenic mice to help further understand the impact of this gene on the disease.

A case study was done on a 42-year-old woman who complained of muscle weakness 10 months prior to admission in the hospital. Upon neurological examination, the patient showed muscle atrophy, fasciculation in all limbs and decreased deep tendon reflexes. The patient's older brother, father, and paternal uncle had previously all died of ALS or an ALS type syndrome. The patient developed progressive bulbar palsy, became dependent on a respirator, and had two episodes of cardiac arrest. The patient died from pneumonia two years after the onset of the disease. After studying the patient, it was found that the patient had a two base pair deletion in the 126th codon in exon 5 of the SOD1 gene. This mutation produced a frameshift mutation, which led to a stop codon at position 131. SOD1 activity was decreased by about 30%. The patient's histological examination showed severe reduction in lower motor neurons. Upon further study, this case proved to be important because it demonstrated that SOD1 mutations might not effect steady neuropathological changes, and that environmental and genetic factors might affect the phenotype of the SOD1 mutations.

== Treatment ==
PBP is aggressive and relentless, and there were no treatments for the disease as of 2005. However, early detection of PBP is the optimal scenario in which doctors can map out a plan for management of the disease. This typically involves symptomatic treatments that are frequently used in many lower motor disorders.

== History ==
The disease was first recognized by the French neurologist Guillaume Duchenne in 1860 and termed, "labioglossolaryngeal paralysis". In 1859, Wachsmuth changed the name to progressive bulbar palsy. In 1869, Charcot studied the involvement of the corticospinal tracts and with Joffroy, who noted the loss of the bulbar motor nuclei, discovered the similarities to amyotrophic lateral sclerosis (ALS). It was observed that a distinction from ALS was fatigue that predominated in muscles innervated by lower cranial nerve nuclei, rather than the upper motor neurons.

== Bibliography ==
- Lapiedra RC, Moreno Lopez LA, and Esparza Gomez GC. Progressive bulbar palsy: a case report diagnosed by lingual symptoms. J Oral Pathol Med. 31: 277-279. (2002)
- Hughes TAT and Wiles CM. Neurogenic dysphagia: the role of the neurologist. J Neurol Neurosurg Psychiatry. 64:569-572. (1998)
- Motor Neuron Disorders: Peripheral Nervous System Disorders. Merck Manual Professional section 16, chapter 223f. Merck Online Medical Library www.merck.com. (2005)
- Collins, Joseph. Progressive Bulbar Palsy. ‘’The Treatment of Diseases of the Nervous System: A Manual for Practitioners’’. W. Wood and Company. (1900)
- Swash M, and Desai J. Motor Neuron Disease: Classification and nomenclature. ALS and Other Motor Neuron Disorders. 1:105-112. (2000)
- Kadekawa J et al. A clinicopathological study of a patient with familial amyotrophic lateral sclerosis associated with a two base pair deletion in the copper/zinc superoxide dismutase (SOD1) gene. Act Neuropathol. 94:617-622. (1997)
- Campbell, William W. The Cranial Nerves. DeJong’s The Neurologic Examination. Lippincott Williams and Wilkins. (2005)
- JW Fawcett, AE Rosser & SB Dunnett. Motor Neuron Disease (or ‘amyotrophic lateral sclerosis’, ALS). ‘’Brain Damage, Brain Repair.’’ Oxford University Press. (2000)
