= Infantile progressive bulbar palsy =

- Specialty: Neurology

Infantile progressive bulbar palsy is a rare type of progressive bulbar palsy that occurs in children. The disease exists in both rapid and slow onsets, and involves inflammation of the gray matter of the bulb. Infantile PBP is a disease that manifests itself in two forms: Fazio–Londe syndrome (FL) and Brown–Vialetto–Van Laere syndrome (BVVL).
