= Dorsal trigeminal tract =

Details

Identifiers
- Latin: tractus trigeminothalamicus posterior
- NeuroNames: 606
- NeuroLex ID: birnlex_1718
- TA98: A14.1.05.312
- TA2: 5864
- FMA: 72500

The dorsal trigeminal tract (also dorsal trigeminothalamic tract, or posterior trigeminothalamic tract) are uncrossed second-order sensory fibers conveying fine (discriminative) touch and pressure information from the dorsomedial division of principal sensory nucleus of trigeminal nerve to the ipsilateral ventral posteromedial nucleus of thalamus. Second-order fibers from the ventrolateral division of the principal sensory nucleus meanwhile cross-over to ascend contralaterally in the ventral trigeminal tract along with those fibers arising from the spinal trigeminal nucleus.

The DTT may be likened functionally to the medial lemniscus.

Trigeminal ganglion → first-order neurons → dorsomedial division of principal sensory nucleus of trigeminal nerve (in pons) (synapse) → second-order neurons → trigeminal lemniscus (in midbrain) → (ipsilateral) ventral posteromedial nucleus of the thalamus (synapse) → third-order neurons → sensory cortex of postcentral gyrus (synapse)
