= Bulbar palsy =

Medical condition

- Specialty: Neurology
- Symptoms: Dysphagia, dysarthria, flaccid paralysis, muscle atrophy, drooling of saliva, reduced or absent gag reflex

Bulbar palsy refers to a range of different signs and symptoms linked to impairment of function of the glossopharyngeal nerve (CN IX), the vagus nerve (CN X), the accessory nerve (CN XI), and the hypoglossal nerve (CN XII). It is caused by a lower motor neuron lesion in the medulla oblongata, or from lesions to these nerves outside the brainstem, and also botulism. This may be caused by any of a number of genetic, vascular, degenerative, inflammatory, and other underlying conditions. It can be differentiated from pseudobulbar palsy. When there is airway obstruction, intubation is used.

== Signs and symptoms ==
=== Symptoms ===
- dysphagia (difficulty in swallowing).
- difficulty in chewing.
- nasal regurgitation.
- difficulty in handling secretions, including aspiration of liquids.
- difficulty breathing (airway obstruction).
- dysphonia (defective use of the voice, inability to produce sound due to laryngeal weakness).
- dysarthria (difficulty in articulating words due to a CNS problem), such as slurred speech.

=== Signs ===
- flaccid paralysis, such as soft palate weakness (examined by asking the patient to say aah).
- muscle atrophy, such as tongue atrophy with fasciculations.
- nasal speech lacking in modulation and difficulty with all consonants.
- drooling of saliva.
- normal or absent jaw jerk.
- reduced or absent gag reflex.

In addition, there may be lower motor neuron lesions of the limbs.

The ocular muscles are spared and this differentiates it from myasthenia gravis.

== Causes ==
- Genetic: Kennedy's disease, acute intermittent porphyria.
- Vascular causes: medullary infarction, such as lateral or medial medullary infarction.
- Degenerative diseases: amyotrophic lateral sclerosis, syringobulbia, Wolfram syndrome.
- Inflammatory/infective: Guillain–Barré syndrome, poliomyelitis, Lyme disease.
- Cancer: brainstem glioma, malignant meningitis.
- Toxic: botulism, venom of bark scorpion (species Centruroides), some neurotoxic snake venoms.
- Autoimmune: myasthenia gravis.

== Mechanism ==
Bulbar palsy involves problems with function of the glossopharyngeal nerve (CN IX), the vagus nerve (CN X), the accessory nerve (CN XI), and the hypoglossal nerve (CN XII). These all emerge from pathways in the medulla oblongata. A lower motor neuron lesion can impair their function.

== Diagnosis ==
=== Differential diagnosis ===
In contrast, pseudobulbar palsy is a clinical syndrome similar to bulbar palsy but in which the damage is located in upper motor neurons of the corticobulbar tracts in the mid-pons (i.e., in the cranial nerves IX-XII), that is the nerve cells coming down from the cerebral cortex innervating the motor nuclei in the medulla. This is usually caused by stroke.

== Treatment ==
In patients with airway obstruction due to bulbar palsy, intubation may be used. This can be tracheal intubation or supraglottal intubation.

== See also ==
- Progressive bulbar palsy
