= SLC52A3 =

Protein-coding gene in the species Homo sapiens

Identifiers
- Aliases: SLC52A3, BVVLS, BVVLS1, C20orf54, RFT2, RFVT3, bA371L19.1, hRFT2, solute carrier family 52 member 3
- External IDs: OMIM: 613350; MGI: 1916948; GeneCards: SLC52A3

Gene location (Human)
Chr.	Chromosome 20 (human)
Band	20p13	Start	760,080 bp
Band	20p13	End	776,015 bp

Gene location (Mouse)
Chr.	Chromosome 2 (mouse)
Band	2|2 G3	Start	151,838,431 bp
Band	2|2 G3	End	151,851,178 bp
RNA expression pattern
Bgee	Human / Mouse (ortholog); Top expressed in: right testis; mucosa of transverse colon; left testis; mucosa of ileum; jejunal mucosa; duodenum; apex of heart; deltoid muscle; tibialis anterior muscle; testicle / Top expressed in: intestinal villus; proximal tubule; jejunum; right kidney; transitional epithelium of urinary bladder; pyloric antrum; Paneth cell; crypt of lieberkuhn of small intestine; ileum; epithelium of stomach; More reference expression data
BioGPS	n/a
Gene ontology
Molecular function	riboflavin transmembrane transporter activity
Cellular component	integral component of membrane; apical plasma membrane; membrane; integral component of plasma membrane; plasma membrane; nucleus; cytoplasm; nuclear membrane
Biological process	riboflavin metabolic process; hearing; riboflavin transport; cellular response to heat
Sources:Amigo / QuickGO
Orthologs
Databases	NCBI: entry; OMA: entry
Species	Human	Mouse
Entrez	113278	69698
Ensembl	ENSG00000101276	ENSMUSG00000027463
UniProt	Q9NQ40	Q9D6X5
RefSeq (mRNA)	NM_033409; NM_001370085; NM_001370086	NM_001164819; NM_001164820; NM_027172
RefSeq (protein)	NP_212134; NP_001357014; NP_001357015	NP_001158291; NP_001158292; NP_081448
Location (UCSC)	Chr 20: 0.76 – 0.78 Mb	Chr 2: 151.84 – 151.85 Mb
PubMed search
- Wikidata
View/Edit Human	View/Edit Mouse

Solute carrier family 52 (riboflavin transporter), member 3, formerly known as chromosome 20 open reading frame 54 and riboflavin transporter 2, is a protein that in humans is encoded by the SLC52A3 gene.

== Function ==
This locus likely encodes a transmembrane protein that may function as a riboflavin transporter.

== Clinical significance ==
Mutations at this locus have been associated with Fazio–Londe disease and Brown-Vialetto-Van Laere syndrome.
