= Ventral cochlear nucleus =

Neuron cluster of the brain stem

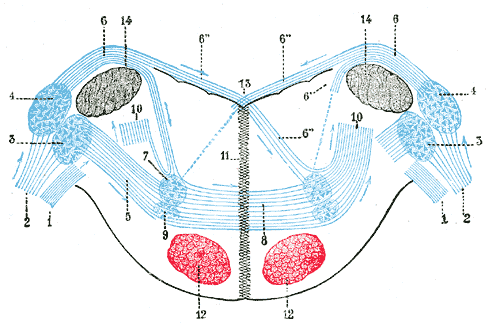
- Ventral cochlear nucleus is No. 3, at upper left

Details

Identifiers
- Latin: nucleus cochlearis anterior
- NeuroNames: 722
- NeuroLex ID: birnlex_2567
- TA98: A14.1.04.249
- TA2: 6006
- FMA: 54621

In the ventral cochlear nucleus (VCN), auditory nerve fibers enter the brain via the nerve root in the VCN. The ventral cochlear nucleus is divided into the anterior ventral (anteroventral) cochlear nucleus (AVCN) and the posterior ventral (posteroventral) cochlear nucleus (PVCN). In the VCN, auditory nerve fibers bifurcate, the ascending branch innervates the AVCN and the descending branch innervates the PVCN and then continue to the dorsal cochlear nucleus. The orderly innervation by auditory nerve fibers gives the AVCN a tonotopic organization along the dorsoventral axis. Fibers that carry information from the apex of the cochlea that are tuned to low frequencies contact neurons in the ventral part of the AVCN; those that carry information from the base of the cochlea that are tuned to high frequencies contact neurons in the dorsal part of the AVCN. Several populations of neurons populate the AVCN. Bushy cells receive input from auditory nerve fibers through particularly large endings called end bulbs of Held. They contact stellate cells through more conventional boutons.

== Cell types ==
The anterior cochlear nucleus contains several cell types, which correspond fairly well with different physiological unit types. Additionally, these cell types generally have specific projection patterns.

=== Bushy cells ===
Named due to the branching, tree-like, nature of their dendritic fields, visible using Golgi's method, they receive large end bulbs of Held from auditory nerve fibers. Bushy cells are of three subtypes that project to different target nuclei in the superior olivary complex.

==== Globular ====
Globular bushy cells project large axons to the contralateral medial nucleus of the trapezoid body (MNTB), in the superior olivary complex where they synapse onto principal cells via a single calyx of Held, and several smaller collaterals synapse ipsilaterally in the posterior (PPO) and dorsolateral periolivary (DLPO) nuclei, lateral superior olive (LSO), and lateral nucleus of the trapezoid body (LNTB); contralaterally in the dorsomedial periolivary nucleus (DMPO), ventral nucleus of the trapezoid body (VNTB), nucleus paragigantocellularis lateralis (PGL), and ventral nucleus of the lateral lemniscus (VNLL). Axons always send a collateral into the MNTB, but do not necessarily give rise to collaterals that innervate each of the other nuclei.

==== Large spherical ====
Spherical bushy cells project ipsilaterally to the LSO, bilaterally to the medial superior olive (MSO) and LNTB, and contralaterally to the VNTB and VNLL. The most important purpose of these projections seems to be to imbue the MSO and LSO with their interaural time and level sensitivities (respectively).

Small spherical

Small spherical bushy cells likely project to the ipsilateral lateral superior olive. They project neither to the medial superior olives or to the medial nucleus of the trapezoid body.

=== Multipolar (stellate) cells ===
Multipolar cells fall into two distinct groups. Those whose axons project out of the AVCN through the trapezoid body, T stellate cells, have longer dendrites than bushy cells that characteristically lie in line with fascicles of auditory nerve fibers. These principal cells are excitatory.

Another name for these cells is 'choppers'. They have an intrinsical rhythm, and will fire action potentials with this rhythm once activated by the right sound.

== Anterior ventral cochlear nucleus (AVCN) ==
The anteroventral cochlear nucleus (AVCN) (or accessory), is placed between the two divisions of the cochlear nerve, and is on the ventral aspect of the inferior peduncle.

- The AVCN can be subdivided based upon the cytoarchitecture of the region.
  - Typical subdivisions are defined as: anterior (AaVCN), posterior (PaVCN), posterodorsal (PDaVCN), and posteroventral (PVaVCN).
- A well-defined tonotopy is evident. Lateral PVaVCN, medial PVaVCN, and medial PDaVCN roughly correspond to the low (<1 kHz), middle (4–8 kHz), and high (>16 kHz) frequency regions defined by Bourk.
- The AVCN projects to nearly all brainstem auditory structures. High frequency regions tend to project contralaterally, and low frequency regions bilaterally, preserving the tonotopic organization of the ascending auditory pathway.
- Stellate/multipolar cells form the projection to both inferior colliculi (central nucleus and dorsal cortex), and synapse in a banded pattern, following the tonotopy of the region.
