= Nathalie syndrome =

- Other names: Deafness, cataract, muscular atrophy, skeletal abnormalities, growth retardation, underdeveloped secondary sexual characteristics
- Symptoms: Sensorial hearing loss, childhood onset cataracts, cardiac abnormalities, skeletal abnormalities underdeveloped secondary sex characteristics, spinal muscular atrophy, growth retardation

Nathalie syndrome is a rare genetic developmental defect during embryogenesis disorder and is thought to be hereditary.

In 1975 a physician described four siblings in a Dutch family with symptoms of the condition; the condition was named after the oldest sibling.

According to Orphanet, the condition occurs in 1 in 1 million people.

Children with this condition appear younger than their age. Nathalie syndrome can cause disability and death around early or mid adulthood. Sudden death, cardiomyopathy, and heart failure have been reported in some cases.
