= Ventral trigeminal tract =

Tract composed of second-order neuronal axons

Details
- System: Sensory system
- From: head, face, and oral cavity via principal (chief sensory) nucleus and spinal trigeminal nucleus
- To: ventral posteromedial (VPM) nucleus of the thalamus
- Function: carry sensory information about discriminative and crude touch, conscious proprioception, pain, and temperature from the head, face, and oral cavity

Identifiers
- Latin: tractus trigeminalis ventralis
- NeuroNames: 613
- TA98: A14.1.05.311
- TA2: 5863
- FMA: 72506

The ventral trigeminal tract, ventral trigeminothalamic tract, anterior trigeminal tract, or anterior trigeminothalamic tract, is a tract composed of second-order neuronal axons. These afferent fibers carry sensory information about discriminative and crude touch, conscious proprioception, pain, and temperature from the head, face, and oral cavity. The ventral trigeminal tract connects the two major components of the brainstem trigeminal complex – the principal, or main sensory nucleus and the spinal trigeminal nucleus, to the ventral posteromedial nucleus of the thalamus.

The ventral trigeminal tract is also called the anterior trigeminal lemniscus.

== Structure ==
The first-order neurons from the trigeminal ganglion enter the pons and synapse in the principal (chief sensory) nucleus or spinal trigeminal nucleus. Axons of the second-order neurons cross the midline and terminate in the ventral posteromedial nucleus of the contralateral thalamus (as opposed to the ventral posterolateral nucleus, as in the dorsal column medial lemniscus (DCML) system). The third order neuron in the thalamus then connects to the sensory cortex of the postcentral gyrus.

== See also ==
- Dorsal trigeminal tract

== Sources ==
- Anthoney, T. R. (1993). Neuroanatomy and the neurologic exam: a thesaurus of synonyms, similar-sounding non-synonyms, and terms of variable meaning. CRC Press.
- Norton, N. S. (2016). Netter's head and neck anatomy for dentistry. Elsevier Health Sciences. ISBN 978-0-323-39228-0.
