= Visceral afferent =

Visceral afferent may refer to:

- General visceral afferent fibers
- Special visceral afferent
