= Trigeminal motor nucleus =

Cluster of neurons in the brainstem

- The cranial nerve nuclei schematically represented; dorsal view (posterior). Motor nuclei in red; sensory in blue. (Trigeminal nerve nuclei are at "V".)

Details

Identifiers
- Latin: nucleus motorius nervi trigemini
- MeSH: D066266
- NeuroNames: 559
- NeuroLex ID: birnlex_1222
- TA98: A14.1.05.410
- TA2: 5940
- FMA: 54562

The trigeminal motor nucleus contains motor neurons that innervate muscles of the first branchial arch, namely the muscles of mastication, the tensor tympani, tensor veli palatini, mylohyoid, and anterior belly of the digastric. It is situated in the upper pons, inferior to the lateral part of the floor of the fourth ventricle.

== Lesion ==
The trigeminal motor nucleus forms the efferent pathway of the jaw jerk reflex. Since the axons involved in this reflex do not decussate, a lesion involving the trigeminal motor nucleus would cause ipsilateral hemiparesis.
