= Jaw jerk reflex =

Stretch reflex of trigeminal nerve

The jaw jerk reflex, or masseter reflex, is a stretch reflex used to test the status of a patient's trigeminal nerve (cranial nerve V) and to help distinguish an upper cervical cord compression from lesions that are above the foramen magnum. The mandible—or lower jaw—is tapped at a downward angle just below the lips at the chin while the mouth is held slightly open. In response, the masseter muscles will jerk the mandible upwards. Normally this reflex is absent or very slight. However, in individuals with upper motor neuron lesions the jaw jerk reflex can be quite pronounced.

The jaw jerk reflex can be classified as a dynamic stretch reflex. As with most other reflexes, the response to the stimulus is monosynaptic, with sensory neurons of the trigeminal mesencephalic nucleus sending axons to the trigeminal motor nucleus, which in turn innervates the masseter. This reflex is used to judge the integrity of the upper motor neurons projecting to the trigeminal motor nucleus. Both the sensory and motor aspects of this reflex are through CN V.

It is not part of a standard neurological examination. It is performed when there are other signs of damage to the trigeminal nerve.

== Factors affecting the reflex ==
=== Sex ===
Studies have shown that there is a significant effect of sex on the jaw jerk reflex. Electromyographs are used to measure the impulse within the muscle, allowing the amplitude of the impulse to be known and shown on a graph. The ECMs were focussed on the masseter muscle and temporalis muscle. Females showed a significantly higher amplitude – meaning that the impulse was larger – than males. This should be taken into account when interpreting ECM results, as a female's graphs will normally show a higher peak to peak amplitude than a male. The mean latency of the impulse was also found to be shorter in females than in males. This variation in females appears to be constant, and is not affected by the menstrual cycle.

=== Age ===
Studies have shown that there has been a slight general increase in latency of this reflex with increasing age. Latency is defined here as the time taken between the chin tap to the first obvious deflection as seen on the subject. The most prominent decline in masseteric activity was recorded in patients aged 75 years and older, which might be due to the reduction in both tendon and superficial reflexes. A study also reports that 52% of the elderly exhibit an absence of jaw jerk reflex, in an average age of 81.8 years.

Jaw muscles do not display very prominent changes in muscular tissue with age in healthy elderly, as their oral cavities are in constant motor movement (i.e.: performing tasks such as talking and chewing etc.). This motion delays the decrease in lean body mass and aids protein retention that comes with age, preventing the muscular tissues from wearing and tearing.

== Clinical significance ==
The clinical presentation of cervical spondylotic myelopathy can be similar to multiple sclerosis (MS) or amyotrophic lateral sclerosis (ALS), however, a hyperactive jaw reflex suggests the pathology is above the foramen magnum. In other words, a normal jaw jerk reflex points the diagnosis toward cervical spondylotic myelopathy and away from MS or ALS.

== History ==
American neurologist Morris Lewis (1852–1928) first described the jaw jerk. But several textbooks of neurology and clinical neurophysiology attribute discovery of the jaw jerk reflex to Armand de Watteville (1846–1925) as he correctly predicted that the jaw jerk would be valuable to detect disease affecting bulbar nuclei.
