= Spinal trigeminal nucleus =

Medullal nucleus receiving skin information from the ipsilateral face

- The cranial nerve nuclei schematically represented; dorsal view. Motor nuclei in red; sensory in blue. (Trigeminal nerve nuclei are at "V".)

- Horizontal section through the lower part of the pons showing the spinal trigeminal nucleus (#11).

Details

Identifiers
- Latin: nucleus spinalis nervi trigemini
- MeSH: D014279
- NeuroNames: 1732
- TA98: A14.1.04.211; A14.1.05.404
- TA2: 6001
- FMA: 54565

The spinal trigeminal nucleus is a nucleus in the medulla that receives information about deep/crude touch, pain, and temperature from the ipsilateral face. In addition to the trigeminal nerve (CN V), the facial (CN VII), glossopharyngeal (CN IX), and vagus nerves (CN X) also convey pain information from their areas to the spinal trigeminal nucleus. Thus the spinal trigeminal nucleus receives afferents from cranial nerves V, VII, IX, and X.

== Anatomy ==
=== Structure ===
The spinal nucleus is composed of three subnuclei: subnucleus oralis (pars oralis), subnucleus caudalis (pars caudalis), and subnucleus interpolaris (pars interpolaris). The subnucleus oralis is associated with the transmission of discriminative (fine) tactile sense from the orofacial region, and is continuous with the principal sensory nucleus of V. The subnucleus interpolaris is also associated with the transmission of tactile sense, as well as dental pain, whereas the subnucleus caudalis is associated with the transmission of nociception and thermal sensations from the head.

This region is also denoted at sp5 in other neuroanatomical nomenclature.

=== Efferents ===
This nucleus projects to the ventral posteriomedial (VPM) nucleus in the contralateral thalamus via the ventral trigeminal tract.

=== Relations ===
The nucleus is situated lateral to the nucleus of tractus solitarius.

== See also ==
- Trigeminal nerve nuclei
