= Principal sensory nucleus of trigeminal nerve =

Cluster of neurons in the brainstem

- The cranial nerve nuclei schematically represented; dorsal view. Motor nuclei in red; sensory in blue. (Trigeminal nerve nuclei are at "V".)

Details

Identifiers
- Latin: nucleus principalis nervi trigemini
- NeuroNames: 560
- TA98: A14.1.05.406
- TA2: 5932
- FMA: 54533

The principal sensory nucleus of trigeminal nerve (or chief sensory nucleus of V, main trigeminal sensory nucleus) is a group of second-order neurons which have cell bodies in the caudal pons.

It receives information about discriminative sensation and light touch of the face as well as conscious proprioception of the jaw via first order neurons of CN V (the trigeminal nerve).

- Most of the sensory information crosses the midline and travels to the contralateral ventral posteromedial nucleus (VPM) of the thalamus via the anterior trigeminothalamic tract.
- However, information of the oral cavity travels to the ipsilateral VPM of the thalamus via the dorsal trigeminothalamic tract.
