= Tofersen =

Medication

Clinical data
- Trade names: Qalsody
- AHFS/Drugs.com: Monograph
- MedlinePlus: a623024
- License data: US DailyMed: Tofersen
- Routes of administration: Intrathecal
- ATC code: N07XX22 (WHO)

Legal status
- Legal status: CA: ℞-only; US: ℞-only; EU: Rx-only

Identifiers
- IUPAC name: all-P-ambo-2'-O-(2-methoxyethyl)-5-methyl-P-thiocytidylyl-(3'→5')-2'-O-(2-methoxyethyl)-adenylyl-(3'→5')-2'-O-(2-methoxyethyl)-P-thioguanylyl-(3'→5')-2'-O-(2-methoxyethyl)-guanylyl-(3'→5')-2'-O-(2-methoxyethyl)-P-thioadenylyl-(3'→5')-P-thiothymidylyl-(3'→5')-2'-deoxy-P-thioadenylyl-(3'→5')-2'-deoxy-5-methyl-P-thiocytidylyl-(3'→5')-2'-deoxy-P-thioadenylyl-(3'→5')-P-thiothymidylyl-(3'→5')-P-thiothymidylyl-(3'→5')-P-thiothymidylyl-(3'→5')-2'-deoxy-5-methyl-P-thiocytidylyl-(3'→5')-P-thiothymidylyl-(3'→5')-2'-deoxy-P-thioadenylyl-(3'→5')-2'-O-(2-methoxyethyl)-5-methyl-P-thiocytidylyl-(3'→5')-2'-O-(2-methoxyethyl)-adenylyl-(3'→5')-2'-O-(2-methoxyethyl)-P-thioguanylyl-(3'→5')-2'-O-(2-methoxyethyl)-5-methylcytidylyl-(3'→5')-2'-O-(2-methoxyethyl)-5-methyluridine
- CAS Number: 2088232-70-4
- PubChem CID: 172873401
- DrugBank: DB14782
- UNII: 2NU6F9601K
- KEGG: D11811

Chemical and physical data
- Formula: C_{230}H_{317}N_{72}O_{123}P_{19}S_{15}
- Molar mass: 7127.85 g·mol^{−1}
- SMILES: COCCO[C@@H]1[C@H](O)[C@@H](COP(O)(=S)O[C@H]2[C@@H](OCCOC)[C@H](n3cc(C)c(N)nc3=O)O[C@@H]2COP(=O)(O)O[C@H]2[C@@H](OCCOC)[C@H](n3cnc4c(=O)[nH]c(N)nc43)O[C@@H]2COP(O)(=S)O[C@H]2[C@@H](OCCOC)[C@H](n3cnc4c(N)ncnc43)O[C@@H]2COP(=O)(O)O[C@H]2[C@@H](OCCOC)[C@H](n3cc(C)c(N)nc3=O)O[C@@H]2COP(O)(=S)O[C@H]2C[C@H](n3cnc4c(N)ncnc43)O[C@@H]2COP(O)(=S)O[C@H]2C[C@H](n3cc(C)c(=O)[nH]c3=O)O[C@@H]2COP(O)(=S)O[C@H]2C[C@H](n3cc(C)c(N)nc3=O)O[C@@H]2COP(O)(=S)O[C@H]2C[C@H](n3cc(C)c(=O)[nH]c3=O)O[C@@H]2COP(O)(=S)O[C@H]2C[C@H](n3cc(C)c(=O)[nH]c3=O)O[C@@H]2COP(O)(=S)O[C@H]2C[C@H](n3cc(C)c(=O)[nH]c3=O)O[C@@H]2COP(O)(=S)O[C@H]2C[C@H](n3cnc4c(N)ncnc43)O[C@@H]2COP(O)(=S)O[C@H]2C[C@H](n3cc(C)c(N)nc3=O)O[C@@H]2COP(O)(=S)O[C@H]2C[C@H](n3cnc4c(N)ncnc43)O[C@@H]2COP(O)(=S)O[C@H]2C[C@H](n3cc(C)c(=O)[nH]c3=O)O[C@@H]2COP(O)(=S)O[C@H]2[C@@H](OCCOC)[C@H](n3cnc4c(N)ncnc43)O[C@@H]2COP(=O)(O)O[C@H]2[C@@H](OCCOC)[C@H](n3cnc4c(=O)[nH]c(N)nc43)O[C@@H]2COP(O)(=S)O[C@H]2[C@@H](OCCOC)[C@H](n3cnc4c(=O)[nH]c(N)nc43)O[C@@H]2COP(=O)(O)O[C@H]2[C@@H](OCCOC)[C@H](n3cnc4c(N)ncnc43)O[C@@H]2COP(O)(=S)O[C@H]2[C@@H](OCCOC)[C@H](n3cc(C)c(N)nc3=O)O[C@@H]2CO)O[C@H]1n1cc(C)c(=O)[nH]c1=O
- InChI: InChI=1S/C230H317N72O123P19S15/c1-98-52-283(220(314)266-178(98)231)139-42-109(407-430(333,445)373-66-124-114(47-144(391-124)288-60-106(9)201(308)280-228(288)322)412-435(338,450)380-72-129-118(51-148(396-129)296-91-259-151-185(238)247-85-253-191(151)296)416-439(342,454)383-79-135-160(170(360-34-24-350-14)209(400-135)291-55-101(4)181(234)269-223(291)317)417-426(325,326)369-77-133-166(176(366-40-30-356-20)213(402-133)299-94-262-154-188(241)250-88-256-194(154)299)424-443(346,458)385-81-137-162(172(362-36-26-352-16)214(405-137)300-95-263-155-195(300)271-217(242)274-204(155)311)419-427(327,328)368-75-131-164(174(364-38-28-354-18)210(399-131)292-56-102(5)182(235)270-224(292)318)422-441(344,456)382-74-130-158(304)168(358-32-22-348-12)207(398-130)293-62-108(11)203(310)282-230(293)324)120(387-139)64-372-431(334,446)409-111-44-141(285-57-103(6)198(305)277-225(285)319)389-122(111)67-374-432(335,447)410-112-45-142(286-58-104(7)199(306)278-226(286)320)390-123(112)68-375-433(336,448)411-113-46-143(287-59-105(8)200(307)279-227(287)321)392-125(113)69-377-438(341,453)415-117-50-147(295-90-258-150-184(237)246-84-252-190(150)295)394-127(117)70-378-434(337,449)408-110-43-140(284-53-99(2)179(232)267-221(284)315)388-121(110)65-376-437(340,452)414-116-49-146(294-89-257-149-183(236)245-83-251-189(149)294)395-128(116)71-379-436(339,451)413-115-48-145(289-61-107(10)202(309)281-229(289)323)393-126(115)73-381-440(343,455)423-165-132(401-212(175(165)365-39-29-355-19)298-93-261-153-187(240)249-87-255-193(153)298)76-370-429(331,332)420-163-138(406-215(173(163)363-37-27-353-17)301-96-264-156-196(301)272-218(243)275-205(156)312)82-386-444(347,459)425-167-134(403-216(177(167)367-41-31-357-21)302-97-265-157-197(302)273-219(244)276-206(157)313)78-371-428(329,330)418-161-136(404-211(171(161)361-35-25-351-15)297-92-260-152-186(239)248-86-254-192(152)297)80-384-442(345,457)421-159-119(63-303)397-208(169(159)359-33-23-349-13)290-54-100(3)180(233)268-222(290)316/h52-62,83-97,109-148,158-177,207-216,303-304H,22-51,63-82H2,1-21H3,(H,325,326)(H,327,328)(H,329,330)(H,331,332)(H,333,445)(H,334,446)(H,335,447)(H,336,448)(H,337,449)(H,338,450)(H,339,451)(H,340,452)(H,341,453)(H,342,454)(H,343,455)(H,344,456)(H,345,457)(H,346,458)(H,347,459)(H2,231,266,314)(H2,232,267,315)(H2,233,268,316)(H2,234,269,317)(H2,235,270,318)(H2,236,245,251)(H2,237,246,252)(H2,238,247,253)(H2,239,248,254)(H2,240,249,255)(H2,241,250,256)(H,277,305,319)(H,278,306,320)(H,279,307,321)(H,280,308,322)(H,281,309,323)(H,282,310,324)(H3,242,271,274,311)(H3,243,272,275,312)(H3,244,273,276,313)/t109-,110-,111-,112-,113-,114-,115-,116-,117-,118-,119+,120+,121+,122+,123+,124+,125+,126+,127+,128+,129+,130+,131+,132+,133+,134+,135+,136+,137+,138+,139+,140+,141+,142+,143+,144+,145+,146+,147+,148+,158+,159+,160+,161+,162+,163+,164+,165+,166+,167+,168+,169+,170+,171+,172+,173+,174+,175+,176+,177+,207+,208+,209+,210+,211+,212+,213+,214+,215+,216+,430?,431?,432?,433?,434?,435?,436?,437?,438?,439?,440?,441?,442?,443?,444?/m0/s1; Key:AZBXTZOFHIRMCD-SIVATHJTSA-N

Tofersen, sold under the brand name Qalsody, is a medication used for the treatment of amyotrophic lateral sclerosis (ALS). Tofersen is an antisense oligonucleotide that targets the production of superoxide dismutase 1, an enzyme whose mutant form is commonly associated with ALS. It is administered as an intrathecal injection.

Tofersen is approved for medical use in the US and EU, as well as other nations such as Australia, Bahrain, Canada, Chile, China, Japan, Oman, Qatar, Spain and the UAE. The US Food and Drug Administration (FDA) considers it to be a first-in-class medication.

Common side effects include fatigue, arthralgia, increased cerebrospinal (brain and spinal cord) fluid, pleocytosis and myalgia. Tofersen can also cause more serious side effects, such as inflammation of the spinal cord (myelitis) and the nerve roots, swelling of the optic nerve (papilledema), elevated cranial pressure and inflammation of the brain linings.

== Medical uses ==
Pathogenic variants in SOD1 account for approximately 2% of ALS cases.

Tofersen is indicated to treat ALS patients associated with a mutation in the superoxide dismutase 1 (SOD1) gene (SOD1-ALS). Tofersen is not approved for use in children under 18 years; there are no determined effective dosages, safety or researched side effects.

Tofersen can be used for patients at various stages of ALS progression. However, early implementation of Tofersen is beneficial as it slows down motor decline and muscle strength, and motor neuron damage is less extensive.

=== Available forms ===
Tofersen is prescribed only to treat ALS caused by the SOD1 mutation. Tofersen has a single, standardized dosage amount for all patients: 100 mg/ 15 mL per administration.

Tofersen is administered intrathecally via a lumbar puncture. This is because Tofersen cannot cross the blood-brain barrier, and intrathecal administration allows Tofersen to circulate with the CSF and reach the CNS (spinal cord and brain tissues), where it can act on motor neurons.

Tofersen is administered by a healthcare professional in a medical clinic. Prior to administration of each dose, a lumbar puncture needle removes 10 mL of CSF. This prevents fluid volume overload and the risk of increased pressure.

The first 3 dosages are called the loading doses: they are given every 14 days. The fourth dosage and onwards are called maintenance doses: they are administered at 28-day intervals. Each dose is slowly injected over 1-3 minutes.

== Adverse effects ==
The most common side effects include fatigue, arthralgia, headaches, back pain, myalgia, an increase in CSF and pleocytosis (increase of white blood cells in CSF).

Tofersen can cause more serious side effects, such as inflammation of the spinal cord (myelitis) and the nerve roots, swelling of the optic nerve (papilledema), elevated cranial pressure and inflammation of the brain linings (meningitis). These require immediate clinical attention and care.

However, the majority of patients who experienced these serious side effects resolved the symptoms without discontinuing Tofersen. Specifically, inflammation resolved in 4 of the 6 affected patients, while all patients experiencing papilledema and increased cranial pressure (4 patients) and meningitis (1 patient), recovered without stopping Tofersen.

Tofersen is an antisense oligonucleotide (ASO), which have been known to trigger immune and pro-inflammatory responses in the CNS. This can lead to pleocytosis.

Side effects from Tofersen can also arise due to the direct effects of the drug, sensitivity with lumbar puncture administration and introduction of foreign materials into the CNS.

== Pharmacology ==
=== Pharmacodynamics ===
In SOD1-associated amyotrophic lateral sclerosis (ALS), pathogenic variants in the superoxide dismutase 1 (SOD1) gene cause the protein to misfold and accumulate in motor neurons and astrocytes, contributing to neurodegeneration.

Tofersen is an antisense oligonucleotide that binds to a complementary sequence in SOD1 messenger RNA (mRNA). The resulting duplex recruits RNase H, which cleaves the mRNA and reduces production of both normal and variant SOD1 protein.

In the VALOR trial, tofersen reduced total SOD1 protein in cerebrospinal fluid and neurofilament light chain (NfL) in plasma. Total SOD1 protein in cerebrospinal fluid is an indirect measure of target engagement, while plasma NfL is a marker of axonal injury.

=== Pharmacokinetics ===
Following administration into the CSF through a lumbar picture, Tofersen circulates throughout the CNS and enters the motor neurons and astrocytes through endocytosis.

== History ==
Tofersen was the first antisense oligonucleotide developed to treat ALS associated with pathogenic variants in SOD1.

Tofersen was developed by Ionis Pharmaceuticals and was licensed to and co-developed by Biogen.

In February 2024, the Committee for Medicinal Products for Human Use of the European Medicines Agency adopted a positive opinion, recommending the granting of a marketing authorization under exceptional circumstances for the medicinal product Qalsody, intended for the treatment of a type of amyotrophic lateral sclerosis caused by a defective superoxide dismutase 1 (SOD1) protein. The applicant for this medicinal product is Biogen Netherlands B.V. Tofersen was approved for medical use in the European Union in May 2024.

The FDA approved tofersen for priority review, orphan drug, and fast track designations under the Accelerated Approval Pathway in April 2023.

== Clinical trials ==
Tofersen's effectiveness was evaluated in a 28-week, randomized, double-blind, placebo-controlled clinical study (VALOR) with 147 participants with weakness attributable to ALS and a lab-confirmed SOD-1 mutation. The study randomly assigned 108 participants in a 2:1 ratio to receive treatment with either tofersen 100 mg (n = 72) or placebo (n = 36) for 24 weeks (3 loading doses followed by 5 maintenance doses). Approximately 43% were female; 57% male; 64% White; and 8% Asian. The average age was 49.8 years (23-78).

The stage III clinical trial was conducted by the Neuroscience Institute and Sheffield Institute for Translational Neuroscience (SITraN) at the University of Sheffield.

== Society and culture ==
=== Economics ===
Around 1-2% of US ALS cases carry the specific SOD1 mutation targeted by the drug. Fewer than 500 patients a year are expected to be eligible for the drug, which is expected to cost over $100,000 for a year's treatment.

Typically, insurance helps cover Tofersen for ALS treatment, given the patient has a confirmed ALS diagnosis, presence of SOD1 mutation, and is prescribed by a healthcare professional. Biogen, the manufacturer of Tofersen, offers 2 copay programs for eligible insured patients to help reduce costs: one program is for the drug itself, and the other is for administration costs.
