= Ribonuclease 4 =

Protein-coding gene in the species Homo sapiens

RNASE4
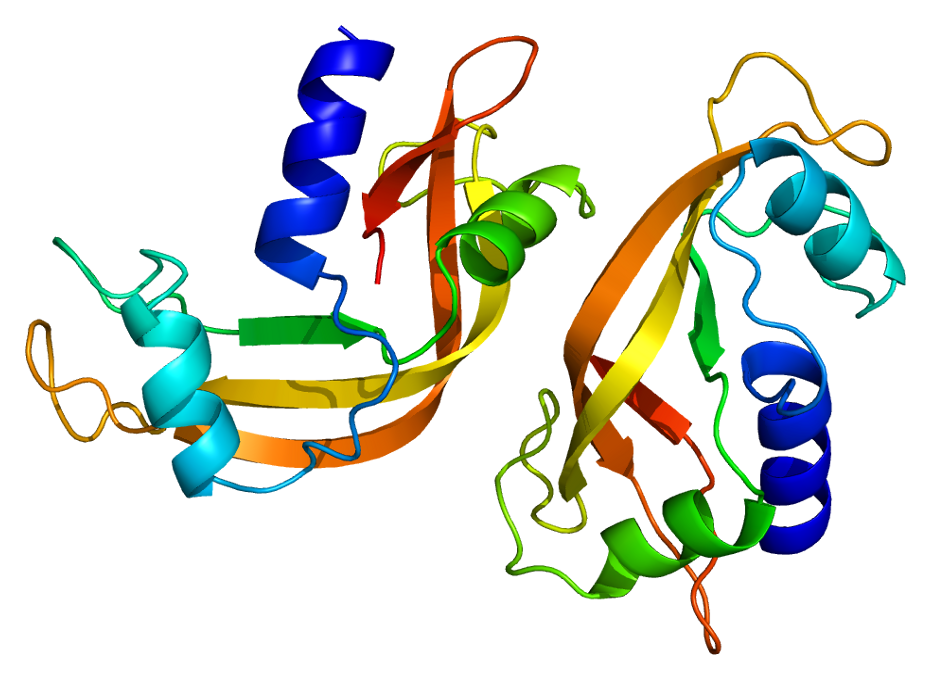

Identifiers
- Aliases: RNASE4, RAB1, RNS4, Ribonuclease 4, ribonuclease A family member 4
- External IDs: OMIM: 601030; MGI: 1926217; GeneCards: RNASE4
Available structures
PDB	Ortholog search: PDBe RCSB
PDB	List of PDB id codes 1RNF, 2RNF

Gene location (Human)
Chr.	Chromosome 14 (human)
Band	14q11.2	Start	20,684,560 bp
Band	14q11.2	End	20,701,216 bp

Gene location (Mouse)
Chr.	Chromosome 14 (mouse)
Band	14|14 C1	Start	51,328,534 bp
Band	14|14 C1	End	51,343,608 bp
RNA expression pattern
Bgee	Human / Mouse (ortholog); Top expressed in: right lobe of liver; Achilles tendon; gastric mucosa; left ovary; canal of the cervix; right ovary; subcutaneous adipose tissue; gallbladder; Descending thoracic aorta; rectum / Top expressed in: left lobe of liver; right lung lobe; carotid body; stroma of bone marrow; crypt of lieberkuhn of small intestine; pyloric antrum; transitional epithelium of urinary bladder; skin of external ear; gastrula; calvaria; More reference expression data
BioGPS	n/a
Gene ontology
Molecular function	nuclease activity; endonuclease activity; ribonuclease activity; hydrolase activity; ribonuclease A activity; nucleic acid binding
Cellular component	extracellular region
Biological process	mRNA cleavage; RNA phosphodiester bond hydrolysis, endonucleolytic
Sources:Amigo / QuickGO
Orthologs
Databases	NCBI: entry; OMA: entry
Species	Human	Mouse
Entrez	6038	58809
Ensembl	ENSG00000258818	ENSMUSG00000021876
UniProt	P34096	Q9JJH1; Q8C7E4
RefSeq (mRNA)	NM_194431; NM_001282192; NM_001282193; NM_002937; NM_194430	NM_021472; NM_201239
RefSeq (protein)	NP_001269121; NP_001269122; NP_002928; NP_919412	NP_067447; NP_957691
Location (UCSC)	Chr 14: 20.68 – 20.7 Mb	Chr 14: 51.33 – 51.34 Mb
PubMed search
- Wikidata
View/Edit Human	View/Edit Mouse

Ribonuclease 4 is an enzyme that in humans is encoded by the RNASE4 gene.

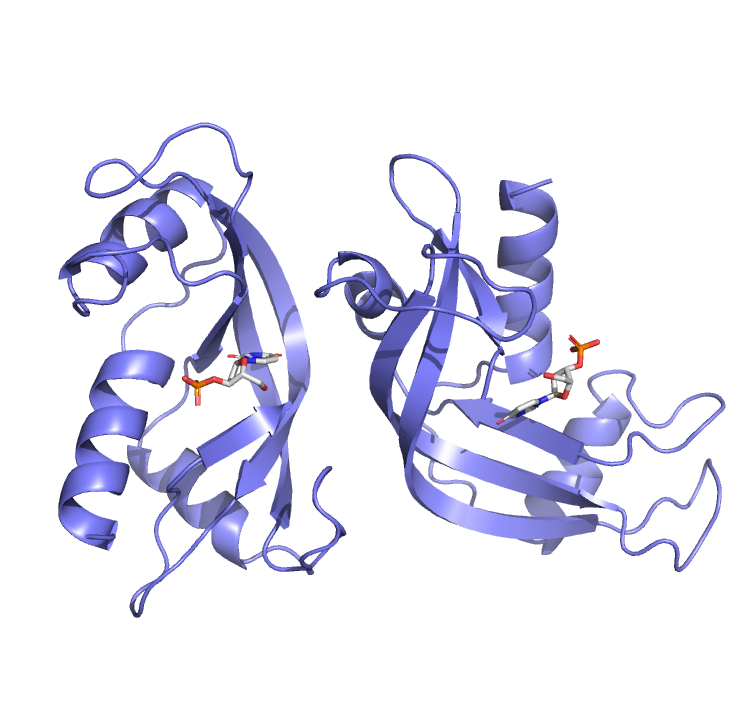
Shown is a PyMol image of the ribonuclease 4 dimer, blue, with deoxyuridine monophosphate, white, in the active site. PDB: 2RNF

== Function ==
The protein encoded by this gene belongs to the pancreatic ribonuclease family. Secreted ribonucleases are the only enzyme family that is vertebrate-specific. Among the 13 members of this superfamily, ribonuclease 4 (RNase 4), is the most conserved gene across different vertebrate species. The human form of RNase 4 is an intracellular and plasma enzyme which was first isolated from colon adenocarcinoma cell line HT-29. It can be found in the pancreas, saliva, and the liver, displaying a similar distribution pattern to that of angiogenin (ANG). It plays an important role in mRNA cleavage and has marked specificity towards the 3' side of uridine nucleotides.

Alternative splicing results in two transcript variants encoding the same protein. RNase 4 is co-expressed and shares the same promoter with angiogenin (ANG), another member of this superfamily. Each gene splices to a unique downstream exon that contains its complete coding region. RNase 4 has also been studied in its involvement with amyotrophic lateral sclerosis (ALS), a nervous system disease, due to its similarity with ANG which has been associated with ALS pathogenesis.

== Structure ==
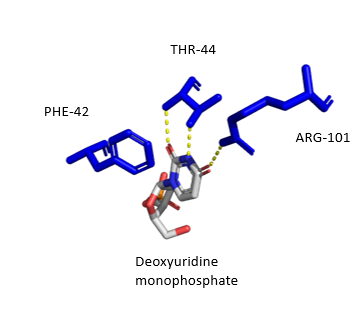
The three residues Phe42, Arg101, Thr44 (shown in blue) contribute to the specificity of ribonuclease 4 by recognizing the deoxyuridine monophosphate (shown in white). PDB: 2RNF

RNase 4 features a unique structure compared to its homologous enzymes in the superfamily. It contains 119 amino acid residues making it the shortest known human RNase and contains no N-glycosylation sites. RNase 4 displays an α + β type polypeptide chain folding and a V-shape with the active site cleft in the middle. It contains three α-helices and four β-strands while the secondary structures are connected by six loops. There are four disulfide bridges located throughout the structure that connect the α-helices, β-strands, and loops. The overall structure of RNase 4 is similar to its homologous enzyme RNase A, EDN, and angiogenin.

A shorter C terminus is a unique feature of RNase 4 which places the carboxy terminus in the pyrimidine recognition site which results in RNase 4 unique specificity. The pyrimidine recognition site is where there are major difference compared to its homologous enzymes. It contains an arginine residue at position 101, a phenylalanine residue at 42, and a threonine residue at 44. These residues contribute to the ribonuclease 4 specificity and are adapted to recognize a uridine-type base over cytidine-containing substrates.
