= Angiogenin =

Protein-coding gene in the species Homo sapiens

ANG
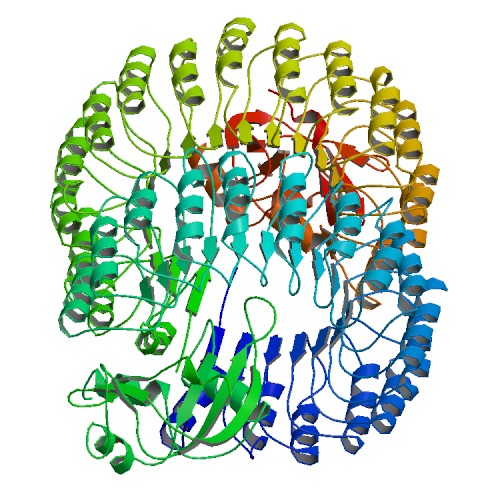

Identifiers
- Aliases: ANG, ALS9, HEL168, RAA1, RNASE4, RNASE5, angiogenin, ribonuclease, RNase A family, 5, angiogenin
- External IDs: OMIM: 105850; MGI: 88022; GeneCards: ANG
Available structures
PDB	Ortholog search: PDBe RCSB
PDB	List of PDB id codes 1A4Y, 1ANG, 1AWZ, 1B1E, 1B1I, 1B1J, 1GV7, 1H0D, 1H52, 1H53, 1HBY, 1K58, 1K59, 1K5A, 1K5B, 1UN3, 1UN4, 1UN5, 2ANG, 4AHD, 4AHE, 4AHF, 4AHG, 4AHH, 4AHI, 4AHJ, 4AHK, 4AHL, 4AHM, 4AHN, 4AOH, 4B36

Gene location (Human)
Chr.	Chromosome 14 (human)
Band	14q11.2	Start	20,684,177 bp
Band	14q11.2	End	20,698,971 bp

Gene location (Mouse)
Chr.	Chromosome 14 (mouse)
Band	14 C1|14 26.37 cM	Start	51,328,607 bp
Band	14 C1|14 26.37 cM	End	51,339,466 bp
RNA expression pattern
Bgee	Human / Mouse (ortholog); Top expressed in: right lobe of liver; left ovary; right ovary; rectum; body of stomach; canal of the cervix; gastric mucosa; Descending thoracic aorta; olfactory zone of nasal mucosa; right lung / Top expressed in: left lobe of liver; epithelium of stomach; islet of Langerhans; Paneth cell; gallbladder; migratory enteric neural crest cell; lumbar spinal ganglion; ileum; ankle; right lung lobe; More reference expression data
BioGPS	n/a
Gene ontology
Molecular function	DNA binding; rRNA binding; heparin binding; protein homodimerization activity; peptide binding; protein binding; nucleic acid binding; nuclease activity; endonuclease activity; actin binding; copper ion binding; signaling receptor binding; hydrolase activity; ribonuclease activity
Cellular component	extracellular region; nucleolus; angiogenin-PRI complex; cytoplasmic vesicle; nucleus; extracellular space; growth cone; soma; basement membrane
Biological process	cell differentiation; negative regulation of smooth muscle cell proliferation; negative regulation of translation; activation of protein kinase B activity; response to hypoxia; positive regulation of endothelial cell proliferation; placenta development; rRNA transcription; activation of phospholipase C activity; activation of phospholipase A2 activity; diacylglycerol biosynthetic process; multicellular organism development; cell communication; actin filament polymerization; oocyte maturation; angiogenesis; positive regulation of protein secretion; ovarian follicle development; response to hormone; positive regulation of phosphorylation; adherens junction organization; cell migration; homeostatic process; nucleic acid phosphodiester bond hydrolysis; RNA phosphodiester bond hydrolysis; innate immune response; antimicrobial humoral immune response mediated by antimicrobial peptide
Sources:Amigo / QuickGO
Orthologs
Databases	NCBI: entry; OMA: entry
Species	Human	Mouse
Entrez	283	11727
Ensembl	ENSG00000214274	ENSMUSG00000072115
UniProt	P03950	P21570
RefSeq (mRNA)	NM_001145; NM_001097577	NM_001161731; NM_007447
RefSeq (protein)	NP_001091046; NP_001136	NP_001155203; NP_031473
Location (UCSC)	Chr 14: 20.68 – 20.7 Mb	Chr 14: 51.33 – 51.34 Mb
PubMed search
- Wikidata
View/Edit Human	View/Edit Mouse

Angiogenin (ANG) also known as ribonuclease 5 is a small 123 amino acid protein that in humans is encoded by the ANG gene. Angiogenin is a potent stimulator of new blood vessels through the process of angiogenesis. Ang hydrolyzes cellular RNA, resulting in modulated levels of protein synthesis and interacts with DNA causing a promoter-like increase in the expression of rRNA. Ang is associated with cancer and neurological disease through angiogenesis and through activating gene expression that suppresses apoptosis.

== Function ==
Angiogenin is a key protein implicated in angiogenesis in normal and tumor growth. Angiogenin interacts with endothelial and smooth muscle cells resulting in cell migration, invasion, proliferation and formation of tubular structures. Ang binds to actin of both smooth muscle and endothelial cells to form complexes that activate proteolytic cascades which upregulate the production of proteases and plasmin that degrade the laminin and fibronectin layers of the basement membrane. Degradation of the basement membrane and extracellular matrix allows the endothelial cells to penetrate and migrate into the perivascular tissue. Signal transduction pathways activated by Ang interactions at the cellular membrane of endothelial cells produce extracellular signal-related kinase1/2 (ERK1/2) and protein kinase B/Akt. Activation of these proteins leads to invasion of the basement membrane and cell proliferation associated with further angiogenesis. The most important step in the angiogenesis process is the translocation of Ang to the cell nucleus. Once Ang has been translocated to the nucleus, it enhances rRNA transcription by binding to the CT-rich (CTCTCTCTCTCTCTCTCCCTC) angiogenin binding element (ABE) within the upstream intergenic region of rDNA, which subsequently activates other angiogenic factors that induce angiogenesis.

However, angiogenin is unique among the many proteins that are involved in angiogenesis in that it is also an enzyme with an amino acid sequence 33% identical to that of bovine pancreatic ribonuclease (RNase A). Ang has the same general catalytic properties as RNase A, it cleaves preferentially on the 3' side of pyrimidines and follows a transphosphorylation/hydrolysis mechanism. Although angiogenin contains many of the same catalytic residues as RNase A, it cleaves standard RNA substrates 10^{5}–10^{6} times less efficiently than RNase A. The reason for this inefficiency is due to the 117 residue consisting of a glutamine, which blocks the catalytic site. Removal of this residue through mutation increases the ribonuclease activity between 11 and 30 fold. Despite this apparent weakness, the enzymatic activity of Ang appears to be essential for biological activity: replacements of important catalytic site residues (histidine-13 and histidine-114) invariably diminish both the ribonuclease activity toward tRNA by 10,000 fold and almost abolishes angiogenesis activities completely.

== Disease ==
=== Cancer ===
Ang has a prominent role in the pathology of cancer due to its functions in angiogenesis and cell survival. Since Ang possesses angiogenic activity, it makes Ang a possible candidate in therapeutic treatments of cancer. Studies of Ang and tumor relationships provide evidence for a connection between the two. The translocation of Ang to the nucleus causes an upregulation of transcriptional rRNA, while knockdown strains of Ang cause downregulation. The presence of Ang inhibitors that block translocation resulted in a decrease of tumor growth and overall angiogenesis. HeLa cells translocate Ang to the nucleus independent of cell density. In human umbilical vein endothelial cells (HUVECs), translocation of Ang to the nucleus stops after cells reach a specific density, while in HeLa cells translocation continued past that point. Inhibition of Ang affects the ability of HeLa cells to proliferate, which proposes an effective target for possible therapies.

=== Neurodegenerative diseases ===
Due to the ability of Ang to protect motoneurons (MNs), causal links between Ang mutations and amyotrophic lateral sclerosis (ALS) are likely. The angiogenic factors associated with Ang may protect the central nervous system and MNs directly. Experiments with wild type Ang found that it slows MN degeneration in mice that had developed ALS, providing evidence for further development of Ang protein therapy in ALS treatment. Angiogenin expression in Parkinson's disease is dramatically decreased in the presence of alpha-synuclein (α-syn) aggregations. Exogenous angiogenin applied to dopamine-producing cells leads to the phosphorylation of PKB/AKT and the activation of this complex inhibits cleavage of caspase 3 and apoptosis when cells are exposed to a Parkinson's-like inducing substance.

== Gene ==
Alternative splicing results in two transcript variants encoding the same protein. This gene and the gene that encodes ribonuclease, RNase A family, 4 share promoters and 5' exons. Each gene splices to a unique downstream exon that contains its complete coding region.
