= Pleocytosis =

Increased cell count in a bodily fluid

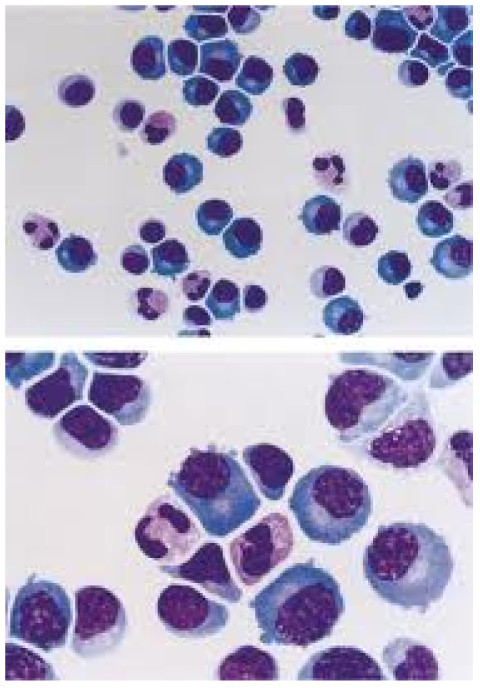
Pleocytosis: microscopic image of cells in cerebrospinal fluid

In medicine, pleocytosis (or pleiocytosis) is an increased cell count (from Greek pleion, "more"), particularly an increase in white blood cell count, in a bodily fluid, such as cerebrospinal fluid. It is often defined specifically as an increased white blood cell count in cerebrospinal fluid.

Increased white blood cell count in the blood is called leukocytosis.
