= St Luke's Hospital, Singapore =

Hospital in Singapore

St. Luke's Hospital

Geography
- Location: 2 Bukit Batok Street 11, Singapore 659674, Singapore
- Coordinates: 1.349393°N 103.742083°E

Organisation
- Type: Community hospital
- Religious affiliation: Christian

History
- Founded: 18 October 1996; 29 years ago

Links
- Website: www.slh.org.sg
- Lists: Hospitals in Singapore

St. Luke's Hospital is a community hospital in Singapore that provides professional healthcare services. It was named after the patron saint of the medical profession, St. Luke. St. Luke's Hospital for the Elderly Sick was registered as a voluntary welfare organization in the Registry of Societies in October 1991. It was renamed St. Luke's Hospital in September 2004 to signify the hospital's role as a community hospital while retaining its focus on geriatric care. The idea of setting up a community hospital was first mooted by a group of Christian doctors and nurses after a report from the Advisory Council on the Aged in 1988 raised important issues concerning the lack of adequate elderly care facilities in Singapore. A projection of the number of facilities and resources needed to provide adequate healthcare services to Singapore's aging population in 2030 revealed serious shortfalls. In response to the problem of inadequate healthcare facilities for the elderly, a group of 8 churches and Christian organizations including the Graduate Christian Fellowship and the Singapore Nurses' Christian Fellowship, came together to set up St. Luke's Hospital for the Elderly Sick. St. Luke's Hospital is headed by a board of directors and various committees that oversee the daily operations of the hospital.

== Opposition to the construction of St Luke's Hospital ==
The groundbreaking ceremony for St Luke's Hospital took place on 6 March 1993 at the 0.78-hectare (1.9-acre) site along Bukit Batok Street 11. Minister of Parliament (MP) for Bukit Batok and patron of the hospital Dr. Ong Chit Chung officiated at the ground-breaking ceremony. Dr. Ong was also the parliament secretary for Home Affairs and Labor. At the ceremony, several residents staying in Block 160, which was 30 metres (98 ft) away from the hospital site, approached journalists to voice their concerns over the construction of the community hospital. The residents expressed concerns over the potential transmission of germs from the sick patients to their children. Also, there were concerns that the resale value of their homes would go down should the hospital be built. Officials from the Ministry of Health (MOH) reassured the residents that the hospital facilities would not pose a health threat to the neighborhood. They also reaffirmed that the patients in St. Luke's will be warded for non-infectious diseases like high blood pressure, stroke, or rheumatism.

In response, MP Dr. Ong Chit Chung arranged for a dialogue session between the residents and representatives from MOH and the hospital. The dialogue session took place in March 1993, where residents directed their questions to a panel. The panel members included Dr. Chen Ai Ju, the Deputy Director of Medical Services (Hospitals); Dr. Clarence Tan, Director (Continuing Care); and Professor Lee Hin Peng, who was the head of Community, Occupational, and Family Medicine and also vice chairman of St. Luke's Hospital. Other concerns raised during the dialogue included the increased noise and traffic levels that might come with the hospital. Dr. Chen reassured the residents that the noise and traffic levels would be minimal compared to those of the emergency hospitals. Mr. Michael Eng, chairman of the Bukit Batok Resident's Committee, organized tours for residents to visit the hospital to alleviate their fears.

== History of St Luke's Hospital ==
The construction of the hospital was completed in 1996, costing a total of $12.5 million, of which $8.7 million was provided by the government. St. Luke's Hospital started its day rehabilitation program on 15 April 1996. The official opening ceremony of St. Luke's Hospital was held on 18 October 1996. The Guest of Honor was Dr. Aline Wong, Senior Minister of State for Health and Education. Mr. S. Dhanabalan, the hospital's honorary advisor, unveiled the commemorative and dedication plaques.

St. Luke's Hospital started with five patient wards with a total capacity of 151 beds. Two more wards were added in May 1997, bringing the total capacity to 206 beds. Further work was planned to increase the hospital's capacity to meet the rising demand for elderly care services. In 1998, the 8th and final ward was opened, bringing the number of beds to 223 at full capacity.

In September 2000, Architect 1990 and Incorporated Builders were appointed as architects and main contractors, respectively, by the Board for a building expansion project at a cost of $1.5 million. With the introduction of MOH's Framework for Integrated Health Services for the Elderly on 12 May 2000, the role of St Luke's Hospital was expanded and upgraded to take in more ill patients from acute hospitals. In this framework, St. Luke's Hospital was classified as an approved provider of community hospital services. The framework grouped elderly care services into 3 zones, linking up the acute hospitals with the community hospitals in the respective zones. St. Luke's Hospital was linked up with the geriatric department in Alexandra Hospital, resulting in a higher volume of patients transferred from the acute hospitals. To meet the increase in demand, the existing inpatient gymnasium was expanded, and 2 more rooms were added to the day rehabilitation center. Also, a medical records office was added on the third floor. This building expansion project was completed in the middle of 2001.

In 2003, the hospital underwent a massive makeover in response to the increasing demand for its services. Also, to streamline its operations with external agencies and improve staff productivity, St. Luke's acquired a new server and upgraded its existing information technology infrastructure (IT) to suit its new operational needs. Cyclical maintenance works were carried out at a cost of $224,000, with the Ministry of Health funding 90% of the cost. Another re-development project was carried out in 2 phases with the aim of providing better quality of care to the patients. The first phase of redevelopment was completed in 2005, adding a new outpatient clinic to the hospital's facilities. The second phase of redevelopment commenced in March 2005. This phase of development involved upgrading the existing wards, building new patient activity areas, improving the landscape, and building a new lobby.

The Community Integration Program (CIP) was introduced in 2003 to help patients regain the confidence to ambulate in public places after a long hospitalization period. Patients who were unable to perform the motor skills acquired at St. Luke's Hospital due to differences in the environment in the hospital and home were also selected for this program. The CIP team visits patients at home to provide rehabilitation that allows them to enjoy a higher degree of independence. Patients had the opportunity to visit the Singapore Zoo, Bukit Batok Nature Reserve, and a mega fun fair at the Methodist Girls School as part of the training program.

With the greater need to improve the delivery of healthcare services to the elderly, MOH invited Dr. Samuel Charles Scherer, an expert on step-down care, to share his experience with the healthcare community in Singapore under the Manpower Development Program in March 2004. Dr Scherer is a geriatrician from Melbourne, Australia. He is the chairman of the Policy and Planning Committee of the Australian Society for Geriatric Medicine. In collaboration with the Association of Community Aged Care Physicians and with the funding provided by MOH, St. Luke's became the first community hospital to host Dr. Scherer. Dr. Scherer visited St. Luke's Hospital on 22 March to discuss fall risk assessment and prevention in the elderly. This visit also attracted healthcare professionals from other institutions. Other healthcare experts like Dr. Jennifer Bottomley visited St. Luke's Hospital in 2005 and provided valuable advice regarding fall prevention in the elderly.

== St Luke's Hospital as a learning center ==
Besides being a healthcare service provider for the elderly, St. Luke's Hospital also focuses on providing an education program to meet the needs of its professional, medical, and lay staff workers. With the aim of keeping its staff updated with the latest developments in the medical field, St. Luke's Hospital organized a program with eleven lunchtime talks a year that focuses on healthcare for the elderly. St. Luke's Hospital also functions as a teaching hospital for doctors pursuing diplomas in geriatric and family medicine courses at the NUS Graduate School of Medicine. The diploma program was accredited by the Singapore Medical Board in 1998, and St. Luke's Hospital became a center for the diploma of geriatric medicine course.

== St Luke's Hospital outpatient clinic ==
Built in 2005, the outpatient clinic provides continuous health care services to the patients after they are discharged. The clinic houses X-ray and diabetic retinal photography facilities. The outpatient clinic also has a wound clinic and a follow-up clinic as well. The wound clinic offers wound management services to outpatients, a service that was previously only available to inpatients. The outpatient clinic was commissioned by the World Health Organization (WHO) in February 2007 to be one of the three primary care establishments in Singapore to pilot the WHO age-friendly concept and toolkit.

== Support for stroke victims ==
In 2004, St. Luke's Hospital, together with the Social Service Training Institute (SSTI) and the Neuro-Developmental Treatment Association (NDTA) Incorporated, organized a course to help adult stroke victims. Neuro-developmental treatment is a new treatment concept that enhances stroke victims' rate of recovery and helps them to achieve a better quality of life. The Bobath concept was created by Dr. Karel and Berta Bobath. The course was attended by 24 physiotherapists, occupational therapists, and speech therapists from 13 different organizations.

The Stroke Club, a patient support group at St. Luke's Hospital, held its first meeting on 25 June 2005. The club is the hospital's collaborative effort with the Singapore National Stroke Association (SNSA) to provide stroke survivors and carers with an avenue of support. The Stroke Club's collaboration with St. Luke's Hospital ended in 2007. A new stroke therapy service was introduced in 2007 to help stroke victims recover the functional use of their hands using constraint-induced movement therapy. This new therapy was developed by Dr. Edward Taub of the Taub Clinic at the University of Alabama at Birmingham Hospital, United States. St. Luke's Hospital purchased the therapy package from the Taub Clinic. The course fee is S$600, with the hospital subsidizing all its patients. The therapy is offered as a 10-day program with three half-hour-long sessions each day. During the therapy sessions, patients play video games and perform simple actions repeatedly with the aim of restoring movement in their affected arm. This is achieved by restricting movement in their unaffected arm. St. Luke's is the only hospital that offers this therapy service in Singapore.

== Awards received ==
St. Luke's Hospital was awarded the Singapore H.E.A.L.T.H. (Helping Employee Achieve Life-Time Health) bronze award in 2001, 2002, and 2005, the silver award in 2006 and the gold award in 2008 and 2010. The award recognizes the role of the hospital in promoting workplace health. Also, St. Luke's volunteer coordinator, Ms. Magdalene Choo, was awarded the Outstanding Volunteer Coordinator Award by the National Volunteer Council (NVC) in 2002. The MOH Nurses' Merit Award was awarded to Senior Nurse Manager Christina Choy in 2005. In the same year, Professor Lee Hin Peng, the Chairman of St. Luke's Hospital, was awarded the Public Service Star (BBM) Award. Mr. Foong Daw Ching took over the chairmanship of St. Luke's Hospital from Professor Lee Hin Peng in 2006. Mr. Foong himself was also awarded the Public Service Medal (PBM) in 2003 for his outstanding services as St Luke's Honorary Treasurer. In 2006, the Head of Medical Services Dr. Tan Boon Yeow, and senior physiotherapist Kung Beng Keng, received the Courage Fund and Healthcare Humanity Awards. On 29 July 2011, Ms. Susie Goh, Director of Nursing, received Singapore's highest award for nurses, the President's Award for Nurses.

== Volunteerism in St Luke's Hospital and fund-raising efforts ==
Volunteers have played a significant role in the delivery of quality healthcare services to elderly patients since St. Luke's Hospital was founded. In 1996, more than 100 volunteer doctors, pharmacists, speech therapists, and other lay helpers helped full-time staff to keep the hospital running. On top of helping to keep the hospital's operational costs low over the years, volunteers have also played an active role in the hospital's fundraising efforts. The St. Luke's Hospital Volunteer Program, headed by Ms. Magdalene Choo, was launched in March 1996. In 1997, the hospital's dental clinic was started by two volunteer dentists, Dr. Lilian Wee and Dr. Chan-Liok Yew Ai. The dental clinic at the outpatient clinic continues to be run by a group of volunteer dentists. Also, a group of volunteers helps out with the hospital's daily operations every Thursday. They help in accompanying patients on their check-ups to acute hospitals, befriending the patients, and becoming assistants to the nurses on duty. Some of the volunteers include trainee pilots from the Singapore Airlines Singapore Flying College, students from Swiss Cottage Secondary School, and the Boys Brigade.

Besides assisting in the operations of the hospital, volunteers also play an important role in the hospital's fund-raising efforts. In 1996, students from Bukit Batok Secondary School raised nearly S$50,000 from a charity jogathon to purchase an ambulance for the hospital. The ambulance is now used to transport patients to the hospital's day center. Another charity Jogathon in May 1997 raised about S$300,000 for the hospital. Dr. Tony Tan was the Guest of Honor at the event. The Methodist Girls School has also been supporting St Luke's Hospital every year since 1997 through various fund-raising efforts like food, fun fairs, music recitals, and concerts. The Zonta Club, which is a group of women professionals, adopted St. Luke's Hospital as their ongoing community project in 1996. The club has raised approximately S$2 million for the hospital. St. Luke's Hospital also organizes several major fund-raising events each year. The Hong Bao project attracts participants from over 200 schools every year to support St. Luke's fund-raising efforts. In this project, students are encouraged to donate a hong bao to the hospital. In 2010, Mr. Richard Tay, a faithful volunteer at SLH, received the Rotary Club of Singapore's Good Samaritan Award. St. Luke's Hospital also holds its annual Flag Day event to raise funds to meet its operational costs.

== Patient subsidies ==
The means test was introduced by MOH in 2000 to provide financial assistance to elderly patients who could not afford the intermediate healthcare services, especially if the period of hospitalization was long. Patients qualify for varying levels of subsidy from the government using the means test as an income assessment framework. The rate of subsidy that a patient qualifies for depends on the per capita income of the patient's family. Ownership of major assets, such as private property, is also taken into consideration. The means test was also introduced as part of the changes proposed by an inter-ministerial committee on healthcare for elderly patients. The committee proposed that voluntary welfare organizations expand their services to cater to the elderly from middle-income families as well, a departure from the traditional practice of catering to the poor only. As such, means testing facilitates the allocation of scarce healthcare resources to patients who have genuine financial difficulties.

Besides means testing, the hospital has also put in place several policies to help patients who have genuine financial difficulties. Patients under public assistance do not have to pay their hospitalization fees. For patients who do not qualify for public assistance but are in need of financial assistance, the St. Luke's Patient Welfare Fund enables them to undergo rehabilitation even though they are not able to pay. The Patient Welfare Fund is funded by donations from Christian organizations and the public. In the year 2000, more than 110 patients benefitted from the Patient Welfare Fund.

== St Luke's ElderCare Ltd ==
St. Luke's ElderCare Ltd. started in 1999 with the aim of providing appropriate elder care services to families who require assistance to take care of their elderly relatives when they are at work. With the rapidly greying population of Singapore, there is a greater need for daycare centers for the elderly within the community. As of 2015, there are 11 ElderCare centers throughout Singapore. The centers are located at Bukit Timah, Changkat, Clementi, Hougang, Jurong East, Serangoon, Tampines, Telok Blangah, Whampoa, and Yishun. The centers provide both social and maintenance rehabilitation services for the elderly. Social rehabilitation involves providing a place for the elderly to spend their time in. Maintenance rehabilitation, on the other hand, refers to physiotherapy and occupational therapy. Besides providing elderly care services, the centers also have a volunteer program to get the youth to interact with the elderly.
