= Pusher syndrome =

- Specialty: Neurology

Pusher syndrome is a condition observed in some people following a stroke or other condition which has left them with one side weakened due to hemiparesis. Sufferers exhibit a tendency to actively push away from the unweakened side, thus leading to a loss of postural balance. It can be a result of left or right brain damage. In contrast to most stroke patients, who typically prefer more weight-bearing on their non-hemiparetic side, this abnormal condition can vary in severity and leads to a loss of postural balance. The lesion involved in this syndrome is thought to be in the posterior thalamus on either side, or multiple areas of the right cerebral hemisphere.

== Signs and symptoms ==
In people with acute stroke and hemiparesis, the disorder is present in 10.4% of patients. Rehabilitation may take longer in patients that display pusher behaviour. The Copenhagen Stroke Study found that patients that presented with ipsilateral pushing used 3.6 weeks more to reach the same functional outcome level on the Barthel Index, than did patients without ipsilateral pushing.

Pushing behavior has shown that perception of body posture in relation to gravity is altered. Patients experience their body as oriented "upright" when the body is actually tilted to the side of the brain lesion. In addition, patients seem to show no disturbed processing of visual and vestibular inputs when determining subjective visual vertical. In sitting, the push presents as a strong lateral lean toward the affected side and in standing, creates a highly unstable situation as the patient is unable to support their body weight on the weakened lower extremity. The increased risk of falls must be addressed with therapy to correct their altered perception of vertical.

Pusher syndrome is sometimes confused with and used interchangeably as the term hemispatial neglect, and some previous theories suggest that neglect leads to pusher syndrome. However, another study had observed that pusher syndrome is also present in patients with left hemisphere lesions, leading to aphasia, providing a stark contrast to what was previously believed regarding hemispatial neglect, which mostly occurs with a right hemisphere lesion.

Karnath summarizes these two conflicting views, as they conclude that both neglect and aphasia are highly correlated with pusher syndrome possibly due to the close proximity of relevant brain structures associated with these two respective syndromes. However, the article goes on to state that it is imperative to note that both neglect and aphasia are not the underlying causes of pusher syndrome.

== Cause ==
The underlying pathology is thought to affect the posterior thalamus which is the fundamental brain structure that controls body upright posture.

== Pathophysiology ==
With a diagnosis of pusher behaviour, three important variables should be seen, the most obvious of which is spontaneous body posture of a longitudinal tilt of the torso toward the paretic side of the body occurring on a regular basis and not only on occasion. The use of the nonparetic extremities to create the pathological lateral tilt of the body axis is another sign to be noted when diagnosing for pusher behaviour. This includes abduction and extension of the extremities of the non-affected side, to help in the push toward the affected (paretic) side. The third variable that is seen is that attempts of the therapist to correct the pusher posture by aiming to realign them to upright posture are resisted by the patient.

== Treatment ==
Physical therapists focus on motor learning strategies when treating these patients. Verbal cues, consistent feedback, practicing correct orientation and weight shifting are all effective strategies used to reduce the effects of this disorder. Having a patient sit with their stronger side next to a wall and instructing them to lean towards the wall is an example of a possible treatment for pusher behaviour.

A new physical therapy approach for patients with pusher syndrome suggests that the visual control of vertical upright orientation, which is undisturbed in these patients, is the central element of intervention in treatment. In sequential order, treatment is designed for patients to realize their altered perception of vertical, use visual aids for feedback about body orientation, learn the movements necessary to reach proper vertical position, and maintain vertical body position while performing other activities.

== History ==
It was first described by Patricia Davis in 1985.
