= Brunnström =

Brunnström is a surname. Notable people with the surname include:

- Fabian Brunnström (born 1985), Swedish ice hockey player
- Gösta Brunnström (1907–1989), Swedish diplomat
- Signe Brunnström (1898–1988), Swedish-American physiotherapist, scientist, and educator

== See also ==
- Brunström
