= Intraparenchymal hemorrhage =

Bleeding within parenchymal tissue of the brain

- Other names: Intraparenchymal bleed
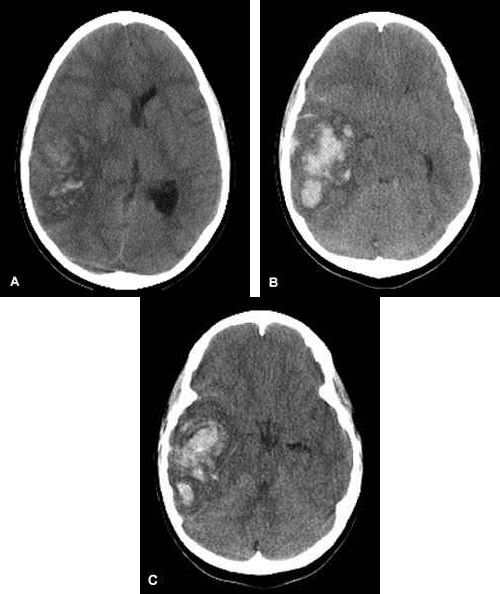
- Multiple intraparenchymal hemorrhage
- Specialty: Neurology, neurosurgery, emergency medicine

Intraparenchymal hemorrhage is one form of intracerebral bleeding in which there is bleeding within brain parenchyma. The other form is intraventricular hemorrhage.

Intraparenchymal hemorrhage accounts for approximately 8-13% of all strokes and results from a wide spectrum of disorders. It is more likely to result in death or major disability than ischemic stroke or subarachnoid hemorrhage, and therefore constitutes an immediate medical emergency. Intracerebral hemorrhages and accompanying edema may disrupt or compress adjacent brain tissue, leading to neurological dysfunction. Substantial displacement of brain parenchyma may cause elevation of intracranial pressure (ICP) and potentially fatal herniation syndromes.

== Signs and symptoms ==
Clinical manifestations of intraparenchymal hemorrhage are determined by the size and location of hemorrhage, but may include the following:

- Hypertension, fever, or cardiac arrhythmias
- Nuchal rigidity
- Subhyaloid retinal hemorrhages
- Altered level of consciousness
- Anisocoria, nystagmus
- Focal neurological deficits
- Putamen - Contralateral hemiparesis, contralateral sensory loss, contralateral conjugate gaze paresis, homonymous hemianopsia, aphasia, neglect, or apraxia
- Thalamus - Contralateral sensory loss, contralateral hemiparesis, gaze paresis, homonymous hemianopia, miosis, aphasia, or confusion
- Lobar - Contralateral hemiparesis or sensory loss, contralateral conjugate gaze paresis, homonymous hemianopia, abulia, aphasia, neglect, or apraxia
- Caudate nucleus - Contralateral hemiparesis, contralateral conjugate gaze paresis, or confusion
- Brain stem - Tetraparesis, facial weakness, decreased level of consciousness, gaze paresis, ocular bobbing, miosis, or autonomic instability
- Cerebellum - Ataxia, usually beginning in the trunk, ipsilateral facial weakness, ipsilateral sensory loss, gaze paresis, skew deviation, miosis, or decreased level of consciousness

== Causes ==
- Hypertension
- Arteriovenous malformation
- Aneurysm rupture
- Cerebral amyloid angiopathy
- Intracranial neoplasm
- Coagulopathy
- Hemorrhagic transformation of an ischemic stroke
- Cerebral venous thrombosis
- Sympathomimetic drug abuse
- Moyamoya disease
- Sickle cell disease
- Eclampsia or postpartum vasculopathy
- Infection
- Vasculitis
- Neonatal intraventricular hemorrhage
- Trauma

In younger patients, vascular malformations, specifically AVMs and cavernous angiomas are more common causes for hemorrhage. In addition, venous malformations are associated with hemorrhage.

In the elderly population, amyloid angiopathy is associated with cerebral infarcts as well as hemorrhage in superficial locations, rather than deep white matter or basal ganglia. These are usually described as "lobar". These bleedings are not associated with systemic amyloidosis.

Hemorrhagic neoplasms are more complex, heterogeneous bleeds often with associated edema. These hemorrhages are related to tumor necrosis, vascular invasion and neovascularity. Glioblastomas are the most common primary malignancies to hemorrhage while thyroid, renal cell carcinoma, melanoma, and lung cancer are the most common causes of hemorrhage from metastatic disease.

Other causes of intraparenchymal hemorrhage include hemorrhagic transformation of infarction which is usually in a classic vascular distribution and is seen in approximately 24 to 48 hours following the ischemic event. This hemorrhage rarely extends into the ventricular system.

== Pathophysiology ==
Most cases of primary intraparenchymal hemorrhage are the result of chronic hypertension (high blood pressure), cerebral amyloid angiopathy, or both. While these are the causative processes for most cases, a number of other pathological processes are known to accelerate or worsen them, including coagulopathy, vasculitis, brain tumors, ischemic stroke, vascular malformations, and others. In general, diseases and risk factors known to damage blood vessels are considered risk factors, but hypertension and cerebral amyloid angiopathy are particularly strongly associated.

The exact process that leads to bleeding depends on the underlying cause. For intraparenchymal hemorrhage associated with hypertension, small holes in arteries are thought to cause bleeding in the deep penetrating arteries of the brain, which are smaller and thinner than other arteries. These are the arteries that supply blood to the basal ganglia, the thalamus, the brainstem, and deep portions of the cerebellum. Thus, these are the most commonly implicated structures in intraparenchymal hemorrhage associated with hypertension.

Cerebral amyloid angiopathy may cause intraparenchymal hemorrhage even in patients without elevated blood pressure. Unlike hypertension, cerebral amyloid angiopathy does not typically affect blood vessels to deep brain structures. Instead, it is most commonly associated with hemorrhage of small vessels in the cerebral cortex. The strongest risk factor for intraparenchymal hemorrhage associated with cerebral amyloid angiopathy is old age, and cerebral amyloid angiopathy is most frequently seen in patients who already have, or will soon be diagnosed with, dementia.

== Diagnosis ==
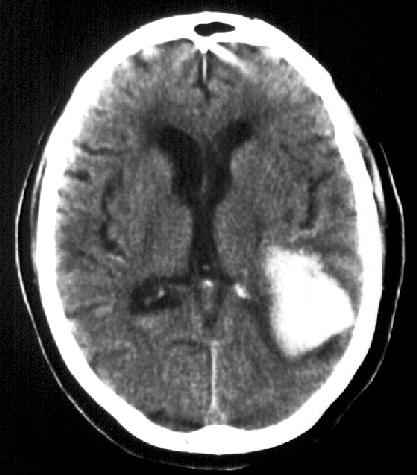
Intraparenchymal hemorrhage

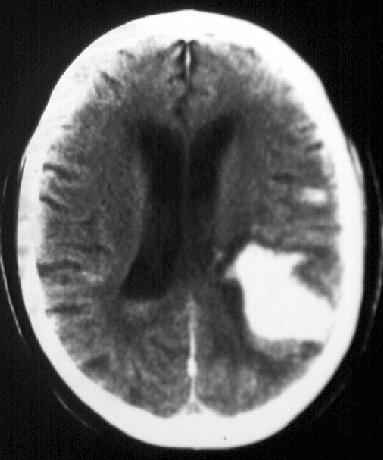
CT-scan of intraparenchymal hemorrhage

Computed tomography (CT scan): A CT scan may be normal if it is done soon after the onset of symptoms. A CT scan is the best test to look for bleeding in or around your brain. In some hospitals, a perfusion CT scan may be done to see where the blood is flowing and not flowing in your brain.

Magnetic resonance imaging (MRI scan): A special MRI technique (diffusion MRI) may show evidence of an ischemic stroke within minutes of symptom onset. In some hospitals, a perfusion MRI scan may be done to see where the blood is flowing and not flowing in your brain.

Angiogram: a test that looks at the blood vessels that feed the brain. An angiogram will show whether the blood vessel is blocked by a clot, the blood vessel is narrowed, or if there is an abnormality of a blood vessel known as an aneurysm.

Carotid duplex: A carotid duplex is an ultrasound study that assesses whether or not you have atherosclerosis (narrowing) of the carotid arteries. These arteries are the large blood vessels in your neck that feed your brain.

Transcranial Doppler (TCD): Transcranial Doppler is an ultrasound study that assesses whether or not you have atherosclerosis (narrowing) of the blood vessels inside of your brain. It can also be used to see if you have emboli (blood clots) in your blood vessels.

== Treatment ==
Intracerebral hemorrhages is a severe condition requiring prompt medical attention. Treatment goals include lifesaving interventions, supportive measures, and control of symptoms. Treatment depends on the location, extent, and cause of the bleeding. Often, treatment can reverse the damage that has been done.

A craniotomy is sometimes done to remove blood, abnormal blood vessels, or a tumor. Medications may be used to reduce swelling, prevent seizures, lower blood pressure, and control pain.
