= OTR =

OTR or Otr may refer to:

== Arts and entertainment ==
- Off the Record with Michael Landsberg, a sports talk show
- Old-time radio, a broadcasting era
- Otierre, an Italian hip hop band

== Science and technology ==
- Ocular tilt reaction, a form of skew deviation involving the anatomy of the inner ear
- Off-the-Record Messaging, an instant messaging encryption protocol
- Oxygen transmission rate, of a substance
- × Otaara, a plant genus

== Other uses ==
- Occupational Therapist, Registered, Licensed
- Ótr, a mythical dwarf
- OTR, IATA code for Coto 47 Airport, in Costa Rica
- OTR (convenience store), Australian petrol and convenience store chain
- Over the road, truck drivers without schedule or route
- Over-the-Rhine, a neighborhood in Cincinnati, Ohio, US
- Public Television of Russia (OTR), a Russian television channel
