= Stroke recovery =

Aspect of medical care

- Other names: Stroke rehabilitation Stroke habilitation
- Specialty: Neurology
- MeSH: D000071939
- MedlinePlus: 007419

The primary goals of stroke management are to reduce brain injury, promote maximum recovery following a stroke, and reduce the risk of another stroke. Rapid detection and appropriate emergency medical care are essential for optimizing health outcomes. When available, people with stroke are admitted to an acute stroke unit for treatment. These units specialize in providing medical and surgical care aimed at stabilizing the patient's medical status. Standardized assessments are also performed to aid in the development of an appropriate care plan. Current research suggests that stroke units may be effective in reducing in-hospital fatality rates and the length of hospital stays.

Once a person is medically stable, the focus of their recovery shifts to rehabilitation. Some people are transferred to in-patient rehabilitation programs, while others may be referred to out-patient services or home-based care. In-patient programs are usually facilitated by an interdisciplinary team that may include a physician, nurse, pharmacist, physical therapist, occupational therapist, speech and language pathologist, psychologist, and recreation therapist. The patient and their family/caregivers also play an integral role on this team. Family/caregivers that are involved in the patient care tend to be prepared for the caregiving role as the patient transitions from rehabilitation centers. While at the rehabilitation center, the interdisciplinary team makes sure that the patient attains their maximum functional potential upon discharge. The primary goals of this sub-acute phase of recovery include preventing secondary health complications, minimizing impairments, and achieving functional goals that promote independence in activities of daily living.

In the later phases of stroke recovery, people with a history of stroke are encouraged to participate in secondary prevention programs for stroke. Follow-up is usually facilitated by the person's primary care provider.

The initial severity of impairments and individual characteristics, such as motivation, social support, and learning ability, are key predictors of stroke recovery outcomes. Responses to treatment and overall recovery of function are highly dependent on the individual. Current evidence indicates that most significant recovery gains will occur within the first 12 weeks following a stroke.

== History of stroke neuro-rehabilitation ==
In 1620, Johann Jakob Wepfer, by studying the brain of a pig, developed the theory that stroke was caused by an interruption of the flow of blood to the brain. After that, the focus became how to treat patients with stroke.

For most of the last century, people were discouraged from being active after a stroke. Around the 1950s, this attitude changed, and health professionals began prescription of therapeutic exercises for stroke patient with good results. At that point, a good outcome was considered to be achieving a level of independence in which patients are able to transfer from the bed to the wheelchair without assistance.

In the early 1950s, Twitchell began studying the pattern of recovery in stroke patients. He reported on 121 patients whom he had observed. He found that by four weeks, if there is some recovery of hand function, there is a 70% chance of making a full or good recovery. He reported that most recovery happens in the first three months, and only minor recovery occurs after six months. More recent research has demonstrated that significant improvement can be made years after the stroke.

Around the same time, Brunnstrom also described the process of recovery, and divided the process into seven stages. As knowledge of the science of brain recovery improved, intervention strategies have evolved. Knowledge of strokes and the process of recovery after strokes has developed significantly in the late 20th century and early 21st century.

== Current perspectives and therapeutic avenues ==
=== Motor re-learning ===
"Neurocognitive Rehabilitation by Carlo Perfetti concept", widespread in many countries, is an original motor re-learning theories application.

==== Constraint-induced movement therapy ====
The idea for constraint-induced therapy is at least 100 years old. Significant research was carried out by Robert Oden. He was able to simulate a stroke in a monkey's brain, causing hemiplegia. He then bound up the monkey's good arm, and forced the monkey to use his bad arm, and observed what happened. After two weeks of this therapy, the monkeys were able to use their once hemiplegic arms again. This is due to neuroplasticity. He did the same experiment without binding the arms, and waited six months past their injury. The monkeys without the intervention were not able to use the affected arm even six months later. In 1918, this study was published, but it received little attention.

Eventually, researchers began to apply his technique to stroke patients, and it came to be called constraint-induced movement therapy. Notably, the initial studies focused on chronic stroke patients who were more than 12 months past their stroke. This challenged the belief held at that time that no recovery would occur after one year. The therapy entails wearing a soft mitt on the good hand for 90% of the waking hours, forcing use of the affected hand. The patients undergo intense one-on-one therapy for six to eight hours per day for two weeks.

Evidence that supports the use of constraint induced movement therapy has been growing since its introduction as an alternative treatment method for upper limb motor deficits found in stroke populations. Recently, constraint induced movement therapy has been shown to be an effective rehabilitation technique at varying stages of stroke recovery to improve upper limb motor function and use during activities of daily living. These may include, but are not limited to, eating, dressing, and hygiene activities. CIMT may improve motor impairment and motor function, but the benefits have not been found to convincingly reduce disability, with further research required. Using functional activities as part of the CIMT treatment has been shown to enhance functional outcomes in one's activities of daily living. Occupational therapists are uniquely qualified to provide function-based treatment in conjunction with a CIMT approach. The greatest gains are seen among persons with stroke who exhibit some wrist and finger extension in the affected limb. Transcranial magnetic stimulation and brain imaging studies have demonstrated that the brain undergoes plastic changes in function and structure in patients that perform constraint induced movement therapy. These changes accompany the gains in motor function of the paretic upper limb. However, there is no established causal link between observed changes in brain function/structure and the motor gains due to constraint induced movement therapy.

Constraint induced movement therapy has recently been modified to treat aphasia in patients post CVA as well. This treatment intervention is known as Constraint Induced Aphasia Therapy (CIAT). The same general principals apply, however in this case, the client is constricted from using compensatory strategies to communicate such as gestures, writing, drawing, and pointing, and are encouraged to use verbal communication. Therapy is typically carried out in groups and barriers are used so hands, and any compensatory strategies are not seen.

==== Mental practice/mental imagery ====
Mental practice of movements, has been shown in many studies to be effective in promoting recovery of both arm and leg function after a stroke. It is often used by physical or occupational therapists in the rehab or homehealth setting, but can also be used as part of a patient's independent home exercise program. Mental Movement Therapy is one product available for assisting patients with guided mental imagery.

=== Balance ===
Stroke patients have limited responses to destabilization due to decreased cortical activity. For increasing balance, overall mixed exercises were found to be more effective (i.e., a mix of high-intensity interval training, resistance exercise, and aerobic exercise), while for walking balance, aerobic exercise was found to be more effective

=== Positioning ===
The goal of positioning in stroke recovery is for controlling muscle tone, giving proper sensory input, improving body awareness and to prevent joint stiffness, pressure sore, contractures, breathing issues and to make eating safer. there are different types of positioning stroke although there is no one recommended position. According to a survey of physiotherapist the most common positioning used is: 98% use sitting in chair with arm rest, side lying on the affected side then on the unaffected side, 78% sitting in a wheelchair, and lying on the back is less preferred

=== Virtual Reality ===
According to the 2025 review by Laver et al., virtual reality, when compared to conventional therapy (weight lifting, task-oriented training, and stretching), leads to slight improvement in upper-limb function and balance, and when combined with usual care, it leads to moderate improvement.

=== Brain repair ===
==== Electrical stimulation ====
Electrical stimulation is being explored as therapy for stroke rehabilitation with the goal of improving motor function and aid recovery after a stroke. Electrical stimulation therapy involves using electrical currents to stimulate or activate nerves and muscles. This electrical stimulation is meant to mimic the action of healthy muscle to improve function. The goal is to help retrain weak muscles so that they can regain function and perform normal movements. There are numerous approaches and techniques to electrical stimulation therapy including functional electrical stimulation (FES) (electrical current is given to weakened or paralyzed muscles), transcranial direct current stimulation (tDCS): (low electric current is applied to the person's scalp to stimulate specific brain areas), transcutaneous electrical nerve stimulation (TENS), and neuromuscular electrical stimulation (NMES) (muscle stimulation using electrical pulses).

==== Bobath (NDT) ====
In patients undergoing rehabilitation with a stroke population or other central nervous system disorders (cerebral palsy, etc.), Bobath, also known as Neurodevelopmental Treatment (NDT), is often the treatment of choice in North America. The Bobath concept is best viewed as a framework for interpretation and problem solving of the individual patient's presentation, along with their potential for improvement. Components of motor control that are specifically emphasized, are the integration of postural control and task performance, the control of selective movement for the production of coordinated sequences of movement and the contribution of sensory inputs to motor control and motor learning. Task practice is a component of a broad approach to treatment that includes in-depth assessment of the movement strategies utilized by the patient to perform tasks, and identification of specific deficits of neurological and neuromuscular functions. Many studies have been conducted comparing NDT with other treatment techniques such as proprioceptive neuromuscular facilitation (PNF stretching), as well as conventional treatment approaches (utilizing traditional exercises and functional activities), etc. Despite being widely used, based on the literature, NDT has failed to demonstrate any superiority over other treatment techniques available. In fact, the techniques compared with NDT in these studies often produce similar results in terms of treatment effectiveness. Research has demonstrated significant findings for all these treatment approaches when compared with control subjects and indicate that overall, rehabilitation is effective. The NDT philosophy of "do what works best" has led to heterogeneity in the literature in terms of what constitutes an NDT technique, thus making it difficult to directly compare to other techniques.

==== Mirror Therapy ====
Mirror therapy (MT) has been employed with some success in treating stroke patients. Clinical studies that have combined mirror therapy with conventional rehabilitation have achieved the most positive outcomes. However, there is no clear consensus as to its effectiveness. In a recent survey of the published research, Rothgangel concluded that

In stroke patients, we found a moderate quality of evidence that MT as an additional therapy improves recovery of arm function after stroke. The quality of evidence regarding the effects of MT on the recovery of lower limb functions is still low, with only one study reporting effects. In patients with CRPS and PLP, the quality of evidence is also low.

==== Robotic Rehabilitation ====
Robot-assisted training enables stroke patients with moderate or severe upper limb impairment to perform repetitive tasks in a highly consistent manner, tailored to their motor abilities. High intensity repetitive task practice delivered via robot-assisted therapy is recommended to improve motor function in individuals in the inpatient, outpatient and chronic care settings. These therapies have achieved the highest level of evidential support by the American Heart Association (Class I, Level of Evidence A) for the outpatient and chronic care settings and Class IIa Level of Evidence for the inpatient setting.

Electromechanical and robot-assisted arm training may improve arm function (measured using the 'arm function outcome measure') and may significantly improve activities of daily living (ADL) scores.

== Stem cells therapies (in research) ==
=== Use of bone-marrow derived mesenchymal stem cells (MSCs) in the treatment of ischemic stroke ===
The terminal differentiation of some somatic stem cells has recently been called into question after studies of transplanted haematopoietic stem cells showed the development of myoblasts, endothelium, epithelium and neuroectodermal cells, suggesting pluripotency. These findings have led to MSCs being considered for treatment of ischemic stroke, specifically in directly enhancing neuroprotection and the neurorestorative processes of neurogenesis, angiogenesis and synaptic plasticity.

==== Possible mechanisms of neurorestoration and neuroprotection by MSCs after stroke ====
Transdifferentiation of MSCs into excitable neuron-like cells has been shown to be possible in vitro and these cells respond to common central nervous system neurotransmitters. However, it is unlikely that this degree of transdifferentiation occurs in vivo and that <1% of injected MSCs become truly differentiated and integrate in the damaged area. This suggests that transdifferentiation of MSCs into neurons or neuron-like cells is not a major mechanism by which MSCs cause neurorestoration.

Induction of neurogenesis (development of new neurons) is another possible mechanism of neurorestoration; however its correlation with functional improvement after stroke is not well established. The inducted cells likely originate from the ventricular zone, subventricular zone and choroid plexus, and migrate to the areas in their respective hemispheres which are damaged. Unlike the induction of neurogenesis, the induction of angiogenesis (development of new blood vessels) by MSCs has been associated with improvements in brain function after ischemic strokes and is linked to improved neuronal recruitment. In addition, synaptogenesis (formation of new synapses between neurons) has been shown to increase after MSC treatment; this combination of improved neurogenesis, angiogenesis and synaptogenesis may lead to a more significant functional improvement in damaged areas as a result of MSC treatment.

MSC treatment also has shown to have various neuroprotective effects, including reductions in apoptosis, inflammation and demyelination, as well as increased astrocyte survival rates. MSC treatment also appears to improve the control of cerebral blood flow and blood–brain barrier permeability, as well as what is currently thought to be the most important mechanism of MSC treatment after stroke, the activation of endogenous neuroprotection and neurorestoration pathways by the release of cytokines and trophic factors.

Although activation of endogenous neuroprotection and neurorestoration probably has a major part in the improvement of brain function after stroke, it is likely that the functional improvements as a result of MSC treatment are due to combined action via multiple cellular and molecular mechanisms to affect neurorestoration and neuroprotection, rather than just a single mechanism. These effects are also modulated by key variables, including the number of and type of MSCs used, timing of treatment relative to when the patient's stroke occurred, route of delivery of the MSCs, as well as patient variables (e.g. age, underlying conditions).

==== What this means for stroke patients and the limitations or concerns with MSCs as a potential treatment ====
If MSC treatment becomes available for stroke patients, it is possible that current mortality and morbidity rates could substantially improve due to the direct enhancement of neuroprotection and neurorestoration mechanisms rather than only indirect facilitation or prevention of further damage, e.g. decompressive surgery. However, for MSC treatment to be used effectively and safely in a clinical setting, more research needs to be conducted, specifically in the areas of determining the relative influences of key variables (especially patient variables) on patient outcomes as well quantifying potential risks, e.g. tumour formation. Although ethical concerns are mostly limited to the use of embryonic stem cells, it may also be important to address any possible ethical concerns (however unlikely) over the use of somatic stem cells.

== Training of muscles affected by the upper motor neuron syndrome ==
Muscles affected by the upper motor neuron syndrome have many potential features of altered performance including: weakness, decreased motor control, clonus (a series of involuntary rapid muscle contractions), exaggerated deep tendon reflexes, spasticity and decreased endurance. The term "spasticity" is often erroneously used interchangeably with upper motor neuron syndrome, and it is not unusual to see patients labeled as spastic who demonstrate an array of UMN findings.

It has been estimated that approximately 65% of individuals develop spasticity following stroke, and studies have revealed that approximately 40% of stroke patients may still have spasticity at 12 months post-stroke. The changes in muscle tone probably result from alterations in the balance of inputs from reticulospinal and other descending pathways to the motor and interneuronal circuits of the spinal cord, and the absence of an intact corticospinal system. In other words, there is damage to the part of the brain or spinal cord that controls voluntary movement.

Various means are available for the treatment of the effects of the upper motor neuron syndrome. These include: exercises to improve strength, control and endurance, nonpharmacologic therapies, oral drug therapy, intrathecal drug therapy, injections, and surgery.

While Landau suggests that researchers do not believe that treating spasticity is worthwhile, many scholars and clinicians continue to attempt to manage/treat it.

Another group of researchers concluded that while spasticity may contribute to significant motor and activity impairments post-stroke, the role of spasticity has been overemphasized in stroke rehabilitation. In a survey done by the National Stroke Association, while 58 percent of survivors in the survey experienced spasticity, only 51 percent of those had received treatment for the condition.

=== Nonpharmacologic therapies ===
Treatment should be based on assessment by the relevant health professionals, although there is evidence that caregivers utilise social media communities to source information related to stroke recovery. For muscles with mild-to-moderate impairment, exercise should be the mainstay of management, and is likely to need to be prescribed by a physiotherapist.

Muscles with severe impairment are likely to be more limited in their ability to exercise and may require help to do this. They may require additional interventions, to manage the greater neurological impairment and also the greater secondary complications. These interventions may include serial casting, flexibility exercise such as sustained positioning programs, and patients may require equipment, such as using a standing frame to sustain a standing position. Applying specially made Lycra garments may also be beneficial.

==== Interventions for age-related visual problems in patients with stroke ====
With the prevalence of vision problems increasing with age in stroke patients, the overall effect of interventions for age-related visual problems is currently uncertain. It is also not sure whether people with stroke respond differently from the general population when treating eye problems. Further research in this area is needed as current body of evidence is very low quality.

==== Physiotherapy ====
Physiotherapy is beneficial in this area as it helps post-stroke individuals to progress through the stages of motor recovery. These stages were originally described by Twitchell and Brunnstrom, and may be known as the Brunnstrom Approach. Initially, post-stroke individuals have flaccid paralysis. As recovery begins, and progresses, basic movement synergies will develop into more complex and difficult movement combinations. Concurrently, spasticity may develop and become quite severe before it begins to decline (if it does at all). Although an overall pattern of motor recovery exists, there is much variability between each individual's recovery. As previously described, the role of spasticity in stroke rehabilitation is controversial. However, physiotherapy can help to improve motor performance, in part, through the management of spasticity. Repetitive task training (RTT), which involves the active practice of task-specific motor activities, improves upper and lower limb function, with improvements being sustained 6-months post-treatment. More research is needed on the type and amount of training.

Unaddressed spasticity will result in the maintenance of abnormal resting limb postures which can lead to contracture formation. In the arm, this may interfere with hand hygiene and dressing, whereas in the leg, abnormal resting postures may result in difficulty transferring. In order to help manage spasticity, physiotherapy interventions should focus on modifying or reducing muscle tone. Strategies include mobilizations of the affected limbs early in rehabilitation, along with elongation of the spastic muscle and sustained stretching. In addition, the passive manual technique of rhythmic rotation can help to increase initial range. Activating the antagonist (muscle) in a slow and controlled movement is a beneficial training strategy that can be used by post-stroke individuals. Splinting, to maintain muscle stretch and provide tone inhibition, and cold (i.e. in the form of ice packs), to decrease neural firing, are other strategies that can be used to temporarily decrease the extent of spasticity. The focus of physiotherapy for post-stroke individuals is to improve motor performance, in part, through the manipulation of muscle tone.

=== Oral drug therapies ===
Oral medications used for the treatment of spasticity include: diazepam (Valium), dantrolene sodium, baclofen, tizanidine, clonidine, gabapentin, and even cannabinoid-like compounds.³ The exact mechanism of these medications is not fully understood, but they are thought to act on neurotransmitters or neuromodulators within the central nervous system (CNS) or muscle itself, or to decrease the stretch reflexes. The problem with these medications is their potential side effects and the fact that, other than lessening painful or disruptive spasms and dystonic postures, drugs in general have not been shown to decrease impairments or lessen disabilities.

=== Intrathecal drug therapy ===
Intrathecal administration of drugs involves the implantation of a pump that delivers medication directly to the CNS. The benefit of this is that the drug remains in the spinal cord, without traveling in the bloodstream, and there are often fewer side effects. The most commonly used medication for this is baclofen but morphine sulfate and Fentanyl have been used as well, mainly for severe pain as a result of the spasticity.

=== Injections ===
Injections are focal treatments administered directly into the spastic muscle. Drugs used include: Botulinum toxin (BTX), phenol, alcohol, and lidocaine. Phenol and alcohol cause local muscle damage by denaturing protein, and thus relaxing the muscle. Botulinum toxin is a neurotoxin and it relaxes the muscle by preventing the release of a neurotransmitter (acetylcholine). Many studies have shown the benefits of BTX and it has also been demonstrated that repeat injections of BTX show unchanged effectiveness.

=== Surgery ===
Surgical treatment for spasticity includes lengthening or releasing of muscle and tendons, procedures involving bones, and also selective dorsal rhizotomy. Rhizotomy, usually reserved for severe spasticity, involves cutting selective sensory nerve roots, as they probably play a role in generating spasticity.

== Post-stroke pain syndromes ==
Chronic pain syndromes are common in about one half of stroke patients. Central post-stroke pain (CPSP) is neuropathic pain which is caused by damage to the neurons in the brain (central nervous system), as the result of a vascular injury. One study found that up to 8% of people who have had a stroke will develop central post-stroke pain, and that the pain will be moderate to severe in 5% of those affected. The condition was formerly called "thalamic pain", because of the high incidence among those with damage to the thalamus or thalamic nuclei. Now known as CPSP, it is characterized by perceived pain from non-painful stimuli, such as temperature and light touch. This altered perception of stimuli, or allodynia, can be difficult to assess due to the fact that the pain can change daily in description and location, and can appear anywhere from months to years after the stroke. CPSP can also lead to a heightened central response to painful sensations, or hyperpathia. Affected persons may describe the pain as cramping, burning, crushing, shooting, pins and needles, and even bloating or urinary urgency. Both the variation and mechanism of pain in CPSP have made it difficult to treat. Several strategies have been employed by physicians, including intravenous lidocaine, opioids/narcotics, anti-depressants, anti-epileptic medications and neurosurgical procedures with varying success. Higher rates of successful pain control in persons with CPSP can be achieved by treating other sequelae of stroke, such as depression and spasticity. As the age of the population increases, the diagnosis and management of CPSP will become increasingly important to improve the quality of life of an increasing number of stroke survivors.

=== Hemiplegic shoulder pain ===
==== Cause ====
Hemiplegic shoulder pain (shoulder pain on the stroke-affected side of the body) is a common source of pain and dysfunction following stroke. The cause (etiology) of hemiplegic shoulder pain remains unclear. Possible causes may include shoulder subluxation, muscle contractures, spasticity, rotator cuff disorders or impingement, and complex regional pain syndrome. Overall, the shoulder is very mobile, and relies on muscles and ligaments to support it, therefore, if a stroke damages the neurons that control those muscles and ligaments, the joint can be affected and pain may result.

==== Pharmacological therapies ====
Analgesics (ibuprofen and acetaminophen) may offer some pain relief for generalized hemiplegic shoulder pain. For people with spasticity associated shoulder pain, botulinum toxin injections into the shoulder muscles has also been shown to provide significant pain relief and improve range of motion. Subacromial corticosteroid injections can be effective for people with shoulder pain related to injury/inflammation of the rotator cuff region.

==== Non-pharmacological treatment ====
There are several non-pharmacological interventions which are recommended for prevention and treatment of post-stroke hemiplegic shoulder pain. These include proper positioning, range of motion exercises, motor retraining, and adjuvant therapies like neuromuscular electric stimulation (NMES) (e.g. functional electric stimulation (FES)). The use of slings remains controversial. Functional electric stimulation (FES) is a NMES technique where nerves or muscles affected by stroke receive bursts of low-level electrical current. The goal of FES is to strengthen muscle contraction and improve motor control. It may be effective in reducing subluxation and the pain associated with subluxation. Different slings are available to manage shoulder subluxation. However, the use of slings remains controversial and may increase the risk of adverse effects on symmetry and balance between the left and right shoulders, and can impact peoples' body image.

=== Shoulder subluxation ===
Glenohumeral (or shoulder) subluxation is defined as a partial or incomplete dislocation of the shoulder joint that typically results from changes in the mechanical integrity of the joint. Subluxation is a common problem with hemiplegia, or weakness of the musculature of the upper limb. Traditionally this has been thought to be a significant cause of post-stroke shoulder pain, although a few recent studies have failed to show a direct correlation between shoulder subluxation and pain.

The exact cause of subluxation in post-stroke patients is unclear but appears to be caused by weakness of the musculature supporting the shoulder joint. The shoulder is one of the most mobile joints in the body. To provide a high level of mobility the shoulder sacrifices ligamentous stability and as a result relies on the surrounding musculature (i.e., rotator cuff muscles, latissimus dorsi, and deltoid) for much of its support. This is in contrast to other less mobile joints such as the knee and hip, which have a significant amount of support from the joint capsule and surrounding ligaments. If a stroke damages the upper motor neurons controlling muscles of the upper limb, weakness and paralysis, followed by spasticity occurs in a somewhat predictable pattern. The muscles supporting the shoulder joint, particularly the supraspinatus and posterior deltoid become flaccid and can no longer offer adequate support leading to a downward and outward movement of arm at the shoulder joint causing tension on the relatively weak joint capsule. Other factors have also been cited as contributing to subluxation such as pulling on the hemiplegic arm and improper positioning.

Diagnosis can usually be made by palpation or by feeling the joint and surrounding tissues, although there is controversy as to whether or not the degree of subluxation can be measured clinically. If shoulder subluxation occurs, it can become a barrier to the rehabilitation process. Treatment involves measures to support the subluxed joint such as taping the joint, using a lapboard or armboard. A shoulder sling may be used, but is controversial and a few studies have shown no appreciable difference in range-of-motion, degree of subluxation, or pain when using a sling. A sling may also contribute to contractures and increased flexor tone if used for extended periods of time as it places the arm close to the body in adduction, internal rotation and elbow flexion. Use of a sling can also contribute to learned nonuse by preventing the functional and spontaneous use of the affected upper extremity. That said, a sling may be necessary for some therapy activities. Slings may be considered appropriate during therapy for initial transfer and gait training, but overall use should be limited. As the patient begins to recover, spasticity and voluntary movement of the shoulder will occur as well as reduction in the shoulder subluxation. Slings are of no value at this point.

Functional electrical stimulation (FES) has also shown promising results in treatment of subluxation, and reduction of pain, although some studies have shown a return of pain after discontinuation of FES. More recent research has failed to show any reduction of pain with the use of FES.

Logical treatment consists of preventive measures such as early range of motion, proper positioning, passive support of soft tissue structures and possibly early re-activation of shoulder musculature using functional electrical stimulation. Aggressive exercises such as overhead pulleys should be avoided with this population.

== Rehabilitation ==
Cognitive rehabilitation for spatial neglect following stroke

The current body of evidence is uncertain on the efficacy of cognitive rehabilitation for reducing the disabling effects of neglect and increasing independence remains unproven. However, there is limited evidence that cognitive rehabilitation may have an immediate beneficial effect on tests of neglect. Overall, no rehabilitation approach can be supported by evidence for spatial neglect.

Rehabilitation for improving automobile driving after stroke

The current body of evidence is uncertain whether the use of rehabilitation can improve on-road driving skills following stroke. There is limited evidence that training on a driving simulator will improve performance on recognizing road signs after training. The findings are based on low-quality evidence as further research is needed involving large numbers of participants.

Yoga for stroke rehabilitation

Based on low quality evidence, it is currently uncertain whether yoga has a significant benefit for stroke rehabilitation on measures of quality of life, balance, strength, endurance, pain, and disability scores. Yoga may reduce anxiety and could be included as part of patient-centred stroke rehabilitation. Further research is needed assessing the benefits and safety of yoga in stroke rehabilitation.

Action observation for upper limb rehabilitation after stroke

The latest scientific evidence indicates that action observation is beneficial in improving upper limb and hand function in patients with stroke. Thus, action observation therapy is generally associated with better arm and hand function, with no significant adverse events. The findings are based on low to moderate quality evidence.

Cognitive rehabilitation for attention deficits following stroke

The current body of scientific evidence is uncertain on the effectiveness of cognitive rehabilitation for attention deficits in patients following stroke. While there may be an immediate effect after treatment on attention, the findings are based on low to moderate quality and small number of studies. Further research is needed to assess whether the effect can be sustained in day-to-day tasks requiring attention.

Motor imagery for gait rehabilitation after stroke

The latest evidence supports the short-term benefits of motor imagery (MI) on walking speed in individuals who have had a stroke, in comparison to other therapies. MI does not improve motor function after stroke and does not seem to cause significant adverse events. The findings are based on low-quality evidence as further research is needed to estimate the effect of MI on walking endurance and the dependence on personal assistance.

== Apraxia ==
An uncommon, less understood result of stroke is a condition called apraxia. This condition was initially recognized as: 'Disorders of the execution of learned movements which cannot be accounted for by either weakness, incoordination, or sensory loss, nor by incomprehension of, or inattention to commands.' Several forms of apraxia are recognized. Limb-kinetic apraxia is the inability to make precise or exact movements with a finger, an arm or a leg. idiomotor apraxia is the inability to carry out a command from the brain to mimic limb or head movements performed or suggested by others. Conceptual apraxia is similar to idiomotor apraxia, but infers a more profound malfunctioning in which the function of tools or objects is no longer understood. Ideational apraxia is the inability to create a plan for a specific movement. Buccofacial apraxia, or facial-oral apraxia, is the inability to coordinate and carry out facial and lip movements such as whistling, winking, coughing, etc. on command. Constructional apraxia affects the person's ability to draw or copy simple diagrams, or to construct simple figures. Oculomotor apraxia is a condition in which the patient finds it difficult to move his/her eyes. Many believe that the most common form of apraxia is idiomotor apraxia, in which a disconnection between the area of the brain containing plans for a movement and the area of the brain that is responsible for executing that movement occurs.

Unlike many effects of stroke, where the clinician is able to judge the particular area of the brain that a stroke has injured by certain signs or symptoms, the causation of apraxia is less clear. A common theory is that the part of the brain that contains information for previously learned skilled motor activities has been either lost or cannot be accessed. The condition is usually due to an insult to the dominant hemisphere of the brain. More often this is located in the frontal lobe of the left hemisphere of the brain. Treatment of acquired apraxia due to stroke usually consists of physical, occupational, and speech therapy. The Copenhagen Stroke Study, which is a large important study published in 2001, showed that out of 618 stroke patients, manual apraxia was found in 7% and oral apraxia was found in 6%. Both manual and oral apraxia were related to increasing severity of stroke. Oral apraxia was related with an increase in age at the time of the stroke. There was no difference in incidence among gender. It was also found that the finding of apraxia has no negative influence on ability to function after rehabilitation is completed. The National Institute of Neurological Disorders and Stroke (NINDS) is currently sponsoring a clinical trial to gain an understanding of how the brain operates while carrying out and controlling voluntary motor movements in normal subjects. The objective is to determine what goes wrong with these processes in the course of acquired apraxia due to stroke or brain injury.

== Lateral medullary syndrome ==
Lateral medullary syndrome, also known as Wallenberg's syndrome, is caused by blockage of the posterior inferior cerebellar artery (PICA) or the vertebral arteries. Signs and symptoms include decreased pain and temperature on the same side of the face and opposite side of the body compared to the lesion, ataxia on the same side of the lesion, and Horner's syndrome on the same side of the face.

Treatment in the acute setting is mostly focused on symptomatic management. After initial treatment in the hospital, some patients will need short-term placement in a nursing home or rehabilitation facility before going home. In hospital settings the doctors work with speech pathologists in issues like these. Typically, a commonly used tool to assess the degree of severity of dysphagia and speech issues is the Barnes Jewish Hospital Stroke Dysphagia Screen, which offers a validated guide to assessing plan of action (solid food diet, all liquid diet, IV hydration, etc.) for the patient while in the hospital and the proper course of action in the outpatient setting. Rehabilitation in Wallenberg's Syndrome focuses on improving balance, coordination, working on activities of daily living, and improving speech and swallowing function. Severe nausea and vertigo can be present and limit progress in rehabilitation and recovery. Symptomatic treatment with anti-emetics and medications for the hiccups are important. Commonly used anti-emetics include ondansetron, metoclopramide, prochlorperazine, and promethazine. These medications are also used to treat hiccups, along with chlorpromazine. There are case reports of other medications useful in treating hiccups in Wallenberg's Syndrome including baclofen and anti-epileptic medications. The prognosis for someone with lateral medullary syndrome depends upon the size and location of damaged area of the brain stem. Some individuals recover quickly while others may have significant neurological disabilities for months to years after the initial injury.

== Post-stroke depression ==
Depression is a commonly reported consequence of stroke and is seen in 25–50% of patients. The Diagnostic and Statistical Manual (DSM-IV-TR) defines post-stroke depression as "a mood disorder due to a general medical condition (i.e. stroke) that is judged to be due to the direct physiological effects of [that] condition". Post-stroke depression may involve depressed mood and decreased interest and pleasure that impairs social and occupational functioning, but does not necessarily need to meet the full criteria of a major depressive disorder.

The first studies to look for an association between specific stroke lesions and the occurrence of depression reported a correlation between left frontal lesions and major depression. Damage to the frontal noradrenergic, dopaminergic, and serotonergic projections were thought to cause a depletion of catecholamines, leading to depression. However, more recent studies have demonstrated that the anatomic aspects of a lesion do not necessarily correlate with the occurrence of depression. Other psychological factors can lead to the development of depression including personal and social losses related to the physical disabilities often caused by a stroke.

The incidence of post-stroke depression peaks at 3–6 months and usually resolves within 1–2 years after the stroke, although a minority of patients can go on to develop chronic depression. The diagnosis of post-stroke depression is complicated by other consequences of stroke such as fatigue and psychomotor retardation – which do not necessarily indicate the presence of depression. Loss of interest in activities and relationships should prompt an evaluation for depression.

Traditionally, tricyclic antidepressants (TCAs), such as nortriptyline, have been used in the treatment of post-stroke depression. More recently, the selective serotonin reuptake inhibitors (SSRIs), such as fluoxetine and citalopram, have become the pharmacologic therapy of choice due to the lower incidence of side effects. Also, psychologic treatment such as cognitive behavioral therapy, group therapy, and family therapy are reported to be useful adjuncts to treatment.

Overall, the development of post-stroke depression can play a significant role in a patient's recovery from a stroke. The severity of post-stroke depression has been associated with severity of impairment in activities of daily living (ADLs). By effectively treating depression, patients experience a greater recovery of basic ADLs such as dressing, eating and ambulating, as well as instrumental ADLs, such as the ability to take care of financial and household matters. In essence, recognition and treatment of post-stroke depression leads to greater functional ability for the patient over time.

== Cognitive Impairment and Therapy ==
Cognitive impairment is indisputably one of the biggest threats following stroke. The prevalence of cognitive impairment is quite high, however it varies based on the population within which the stroke has occurred. Many different causes can contribute to the acquirement of cognitive impairment after stroke. Among the most common are lesions on specific anatomical structures, such as the hippocampus or entorhinal cortex, white matter lesions, and cerebral microbleeds. The extent and type of cognitive impairment depend on the area of the brain affected by the stroke. However, in general, most cognitive impairment always includes either memory, attention, language, or orientation problems.

There has not been any medication developed yet to treat cognitive deficits resulting from strokes. Although some drugs have shown to be helpful with executive function problems, neither of them has demonstrated significant effects on activities of daily living. Thus, it is important that more work is done on pharmacotherapy and its potential benefits for patients with cognitive decline after stroke.

Ongoing research has examined the use of cognitive therapy which consists of intense cognitive training. One of the biggest problems of cognitive training is its actual transfer to the real world. Even though some therapies have been proven to produce improvements on specific tasks, the patients did not experience any improvements in their everyday functioning. For this reason, scientific teams have been trying to develop a reliable transfer package that could be used to train and improve instrumental activities of daily living. Daily instrumental activities can be understood as those activities that allow an individual to live independently. Even though they are not necessary for living, however, these activities may significantly improve the quality of life. Examples of these activities include cooking, transportation, laundry, and managing finances.
