= Signe (disambiguation) =

Signe or Signy is a feminine given name. It may also refer to:

- René-Pierre Signé (born 1930), French politician
- "Le Signe" ("The Signal"), a short story by Guy de Maupassant
- "Signe", an Eric Clapton instrumental piece on the album Unplugged
- Signy Island, South Orkney Islands, Antarctica
  - Signy Research Station, Signy Island
- 459 Signe, an asteroid
