= Signy (disambiguation) =

Signy is the name of two heroines in Norse mythology.

Signy may also refer to:

- Signe, a list of people named Signy or Signe
- Signy Island, an Antarctic island
  - Signy Research Station on the island, operated by the British Antarctic Survey
- Signy-Avenex, a municipality in Vaud, Switzerland

== France ==
- Signy-l'Abbaye, a commune in the Ardennes department
- Signy Abbey, a destroyed Cistercian abbey in Signy-l'Abbaye
- Signy-le-Petit, a commune in the Ardennes department
- Signy-Signets, a commune in the Seine-et-Marne department
