= Ocular tilt reaction =

Form of skew deviation

The ocular tilt reaction (OTR) comprises skew deviation, head tilt and ocular torsion involving structures of the inner ear responsible for maintenance of balance of the body i.e. the semi-circular canals (SCC), utricle and saccule.

Each anterior semi-circular canals has excitatory projections to the ipsilateral superior rectus muscle and its yoke i.e., the contralateral inferior oblique while simultaneously inhibiting the ipsilateral inferior rectus muscle and its yoke i.e. the contralateral superior oblique. Also, each posterior semi-circular canals has excitatory projections to the ipsilateral superior oblique and its yoke i.e. the contralateral inferior rectus, while simultaneously inhibiting the ipsilateral inferior oblique and its yoke i.e. the contralateral superior rectus. A head tilt causes stimulation of both anterior semi-circular canals and the posterior semi-circular canals resulting in excitation of ipsilateral intorters (superior oblique and superior rectus) and contralateral extorters (inferior oblique and inferior rectus) while their antagonists are simultaneously inhibited. The otoliths (utricle and saccule) probably follow a similar pathway.

Normally, a body tilt (along with the initial head tilt) to the right causes a shift of the subjective visual vertical (SVV) to the left resulting in reflex, compensatory orientation of the head to left to realign the SVV to the true vertical.

The initial head tilt to right will cause stimulation of the right utricle resulting in excitory signals to pass to the SR and SO (right eye), and IO and IR (left eye). Simultaneously, inhibitory signals pass to their antagonists. The stimulated two intorters (right eye) and the two extorters (left eye) have opposite vertical actions i.e., one is an elevator and the other is a depressor. The opposite vertical actions nearly cancel each other and therefore only a small vertical deviation occurs, whereas their identical torsional actions are additive. In case of any lesion from the utricle to the brainstem, diminished input from the affected vestibular pathway, for example the left vestibular is the same as stimulation of right vestibular pathway, resulting in the erroneous interpretation by the brain that the head is tilted to the right and consequently that the SVV is tilted to the left. This causes reflex rotation of the head to the left, thus realigning the eyes and head to a position that is actually tilted but which the brain interprets as vertical.

Published literature on ocular torsion in physiologic ocular counter-roll are usually not very clear on the type of head tilt inducing the torsion, i.e., initial head tilt causing a tilt in the SVV or the compensatory head tilt to realign SVV with the true vertical. It has been stated that the ocular torsion in physiologic ocular counter-roll appears in the opposite direction as that of the head tilt in contrast to the same direction of ocular torsion as the head tilt in pathologic ocular tilt reaction.

If instead of the actual head tilt (as compared to true vertical), the direction of the head tilt as interpreted by the brain (subjective head tilt) is given importance, then it is seen that the head tilt and ocular torsion are actually in the same direction in both the physiologic ocular counter-roll and the pathologic ocular tilt reaction. The subjective head tilt as interpreted by the brain in the presence of asymmetric signals from the inner ear neural afferents is the principal factor in determining the direction of ocular torsion in ocular tilt reaction.
