= Holy Trinity East Finchley =

Church in East Finchley, London, England

Coordinates: 51.5922°N 0.1738°W

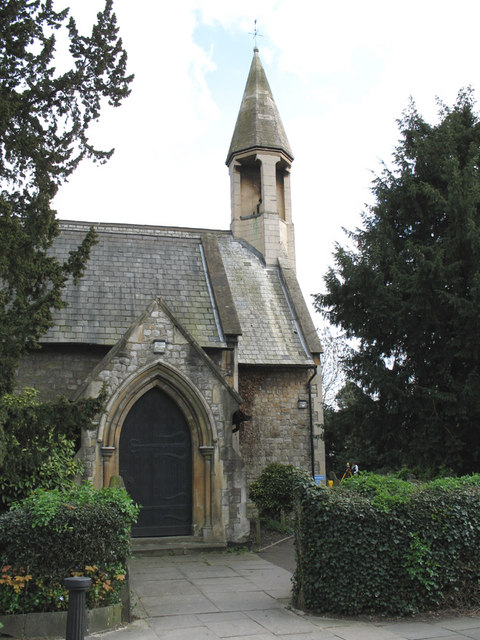
Holy Trinity, East Finchley.

Holy Trinity East Finchley is a Church of England church in Church Lane, East Finchley, London. It is a grade II listed building with Historic England.

It was funded by the Salvin family and their friends, including Lord Mansfield of Kenwood.

It was designed around 1849 by Anthony Salvin who also designed the former Holy Trinity School (1847) in East End Road, now the Bobath Centre for children with cerebral palsy.
