= Bobath Centre =

Centre for children with cerebral palsy in London, England

Coordinates: 51.5895°N 0.1653°W

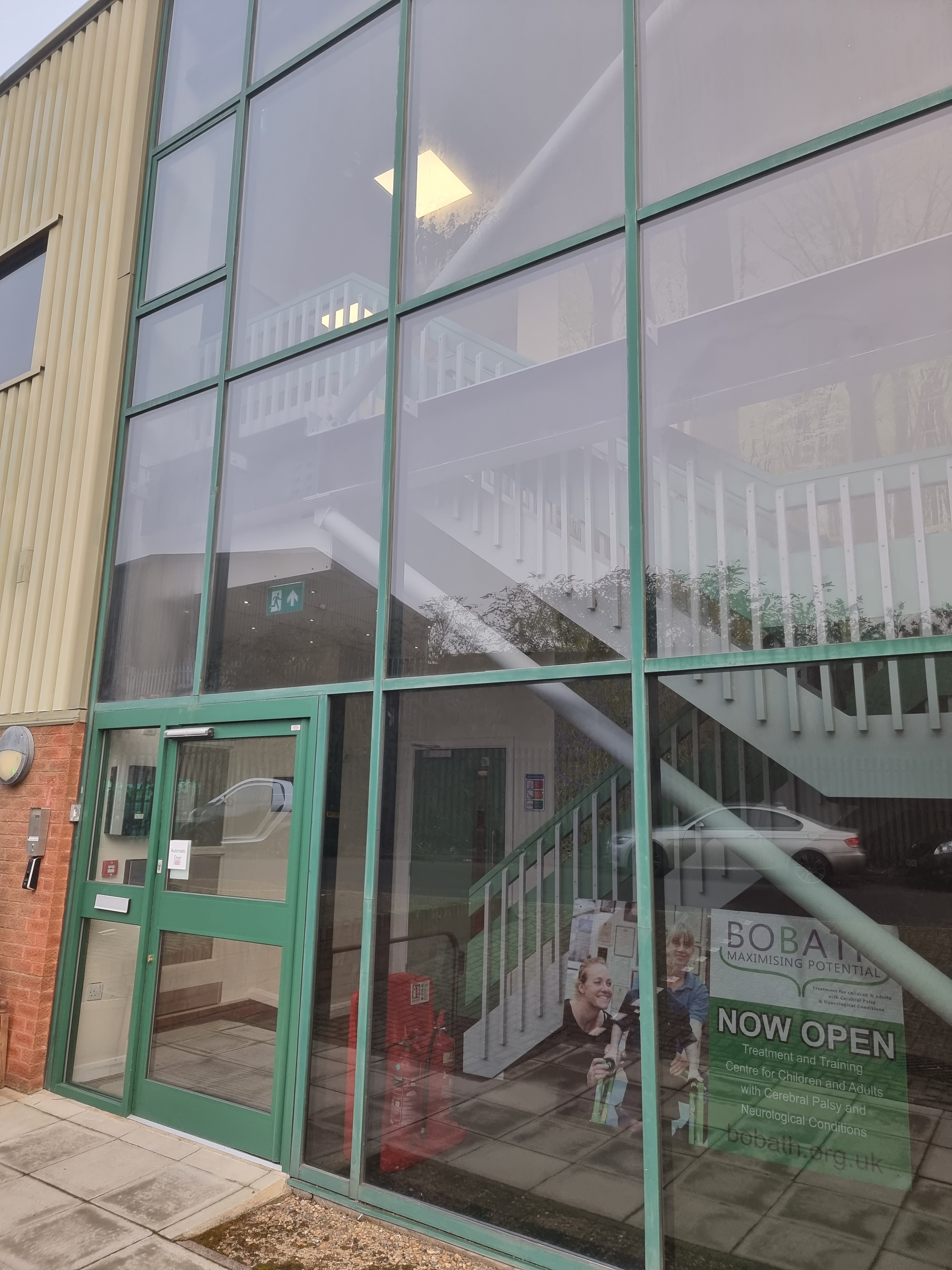
The Bobath Centre

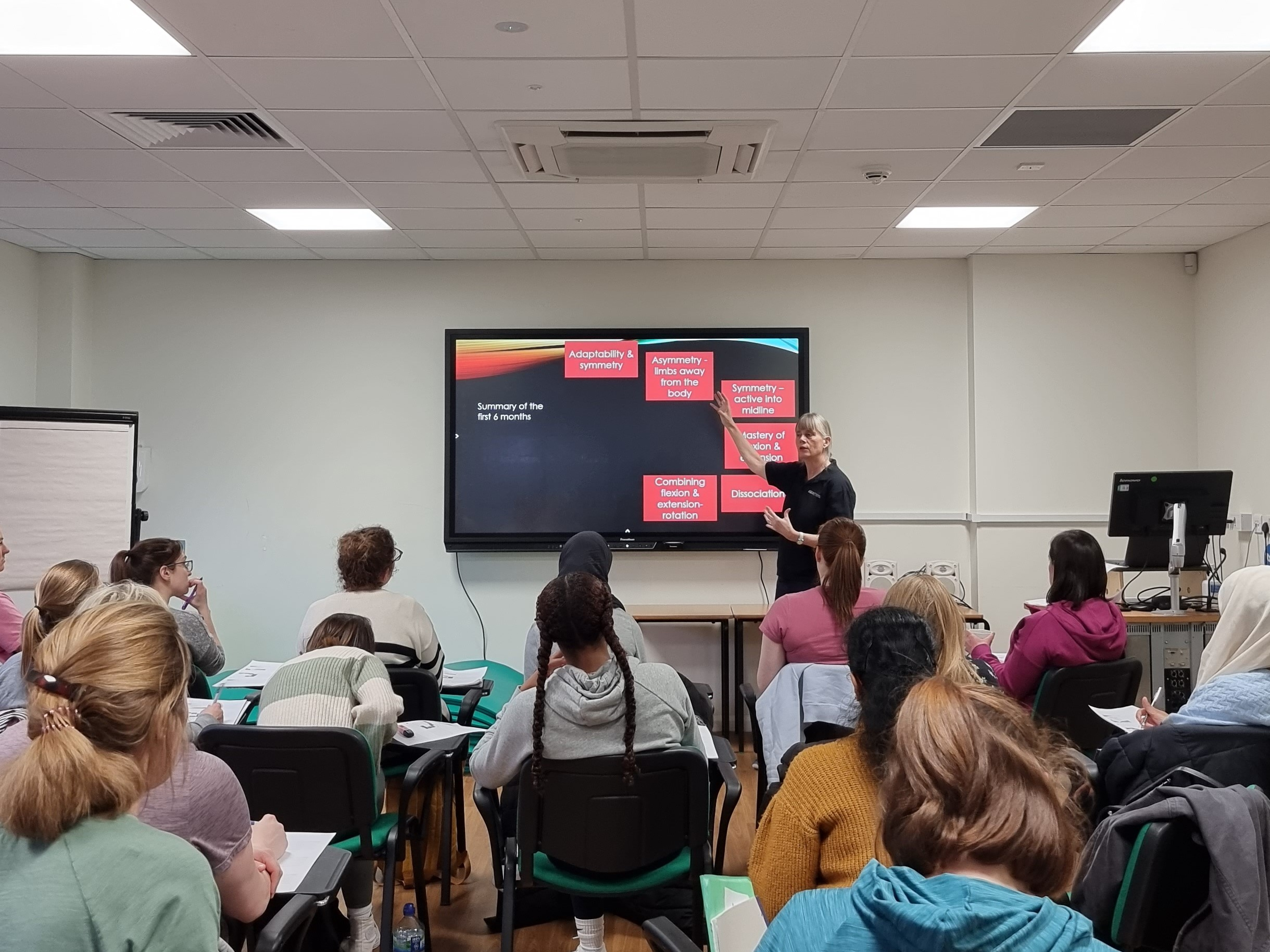
Training Session

The National Bobath Cerebral Palsy Centre (The Bobath Centre) was the original home of the Bobath Approach, providing therapy to those living with cerebral palsy and similar neurological conditions. Its services were available to people of all ages

The Bobath Centre was also a specialist, national training facility for health professionals and therapists. Physiotherapy, Occupational Therapy and Speech and Language Therapy, specifically.

== History ==
The Bobath Centre was founded by husband and wife partnership Berta Bobath and Dr Karel Bobath who developed the Bobath concept.

Originally, The Bobath Centre was located in East End Road, East Finchley, a grade II listed building with Historic England. The buildings occupied by the centre were the former Holy Trinity School designed by Anthony Salvin, who also designed Holy Trinity East Finchley, and the former Industrial School.

The construction of the original school was funded by the Salvin family and their friends, including Lord Mansfield of Kenwood.

On 21 May 2024 the centre announced that it would close on 31 May, citing funding challenges triggered by the Government Austerity strategy and lack of support from the NHS.
