= Hemorrhagic transformation =

Internal bleeding in the brain after a stroke

- Specialty: Neurology
- Usual onset: In majority seen within 4 days of initial stroke. In patients treated with thrombolysis - within 24 hours.
- Types: petechial hemorrhage, parenchymal hemorrhage
- Diagnostic method: Brain computed tomography (CT) angiography

Hemorrhagic transformation (HT) or hemorrhagic conversion is a medical complication that can occur in the brain following an acute ischemic stroke, a condition in which blood flow to the brain is blocked.

Hemorrhagic transformation is a process which involves the bleeding of brain tissue that has been affected by the stroke and can take two forms: petechial hemorrhage and parenchymal hemorrhage.

HT can lead to further damage to the brain tissue and worsen the outcome of the initial stroke. The risk of HT increases with the severity and duration of the initial stroke, as well as with certain medical conditions such as high blood pressure, diabetes, and clotting disorders and the use of certain medications, such as anticoagulants and thrombolytic tpA medication (such as alteplase) which can increase the bleeding risk.

Effective treatment is complex and may involve medications to control bleeding (reversing coagulopathy), management of underlying medical conditions, and sometimes neurosurgical treatment to reduce the bleeding.

== Signs and symptoms ==
Signs and symptoms can vary depending on the severity and location of the bleeding within the brain tissue.

In the medical literature, various criteria have been used to establish whether a hemorrhagic infarction is symptomatic or not. Studies have shown that only parenchymal hematomas are strongly associated with long-term deterioration and worsening of the patient's condition. Most cases of hemorrhagic transformation, including the majority of petechial hemorrhages, are asymptomatic and do not cause noticeable symptoms.

Some common symptoms might include:

- Headache
- Changes in consciousness
- Weakness or numbness
- Seizures
- Speech difficulties
- Vision problems

== Investigations ==
Very low cerebral blood volume (VLCBV) is a measurement of hemorrhagic transformation degree in the tissue surrounding the lesion in strokes. It is counted as one of the penumbral imaging procedures along with less commonly used methods such as diffusion-weighted imaging (DWI). These are used to predict if there is going to be a hemorrhage after the treatment by tPA. In advanced centers, this measurement helps with using tPA beyond the standard time limit (4.5 hours) without risk of hemorrhage.

== Pathophysiology ==
HT involves the extravasation of blood from the peripheral circulation across a disrupted blood-brain barrier (BBB) and into the brain tissue.

== Epidemiology ==
Around 10-15% of patients with acute ischemic stroke experience hemorrhagic transformation.
