= Fugl-Meyer Assessment of sensorimotor function =

Fugl-Meyer Assessment (FMA) scale is an index to assess the sensorimotor impairment in individuals who have had stroke. This scale was first proposed by Axel Fugl-Meyer and his colleagues as a standardized assessment test for post-stroke recovery in their paper titled The post-stroke hemiplegic patient: A method for evaluation of physical performance. It is now widely used for clinical assessment of motor function. The Fugl-Meyer Assessment score has been tested several times, and is found to have excellent consistency, responsivity and good accuracy. The maximum possible score in Fugl-Meyer scale is 226, which corresponds to full sensory-motor recovery. The minimal clinically important difference of Fugl-Meyer assessment scale is 6 for lower limb in chronic stroke and 9-10 for upper limb in sub-acute stroke.

== Development ==
In 1975, Axel Fugl-Meyer noted that it is difficult to quantify the efficacy of different rehabilitation strategies because of the lack of a numerical scoring system. He and his colleagues developed an assessment scale to overcome this problem. The construction of this scale was based on the then existing knowledge about recovery patterns in stroke. Fugl-Meyer was particularly influenced by the 1951 paper authored by Thomas Twitchell, titled The Restoration of Motor Functioning Following Hemiplegia in Man and observations on post-stroke patients by Signe Brunnstrom. In the motor scale of Fugl-Meyer assessment, items were generated based on the ontology and stages of stroke recovery described by Twitchell and Brunnstrom respectively. When knowledge regarding Stroke recovery increased significantly in the late 20th century and early 21st century, Twitchell and Brunnstrom models were not sufficient to explain the motor recovery following stroke. However, Fugl-Meyer test still holds good, possibly because it follows a hierarchical scoring system based on the level of difficulty in performing the tasks.

== Scoring ==
The Fugl-Meyer Assessment scale is an ordinal scale that has 3 points for each item. A zero score is given for the item if the subject cannot do the task. A score of 1 is given when the task is performed partially and a score of 2 is given when the task is performed fully. However, reflex activity is measured using 2 points only, with a score of 0 or 2 for absence and presence of reflex respectively. The five domains assessed by Fugl-Meyer scale are:

- Motor function (Maximum score in upper limb = 66; Maximum score in lower limb = 34)
- Sensory function (Maximum score = 24)
- Balance (Maximum score = 14)
- Range of motion of joints (Maximum score = 44)
- Joint pain (Maximum score = 44)

The maximum total score that can be obtained in Fugl Meyer assessment is 226, though it is common practice to assess all domains separately. The test can be completed in around 40 minutes. To perform the test, the examiner needs a tennis ball, a small spherical shaped container and knee hammer.

== Limitations ==
The Fugl-Meyer scale has only three levels of assessment for each item. Therefore, a majority of patients get an intermediate score in most items, and remain so for a long time. The test is also reported to have ceiling effect in the sensation domain and floor effect in the balance domain. Some researchers report that Fugl Meyer assessment is time-consuming.
