= Signe =

- Gender: Female
- Name day: September 11 (Latvia)

Origin
- Region of origin: Scandinavia

Other names
- Related names: Sigrid

Signe or Signy is a feminine given name used in the Nordic and Baltic countries, derived from Old Norse sigr (victory) and nýr (new), which may refer to:

- Signe (Finnish princess), a legendary Finnish princess
- Signy, two heroines in Norse mythology and two lesser-known characters in Norse sagas
- Signy Aarna (born 1990), Estonian footballer
- Signe Amundsen (1899–1987), Norwegian operatic soprano
- Signe Toly Anderson (1941–2016), American singer
- Signy Arctander (1895–1971), Norwegian statistician and economist
- Signe Asmussen (born 1970), Danish singer
- Signe Baumane (born 1964), Latvian animator, artist, illustrator and writer
- Signe Bergman (1869–1960), Swedish suffragette
- Signe Brander (1869–1942), Finnish photographer
- Signe Bro (born 1999), Danish swimmer
- Signe Brunnström (1898–1988), Swedish-American physiotherapist, scientist and educator
- Signe Bruun (born 1998), Danish footballer
- Signy Coleman (born 1960), American actress
- Signy Stefansson Eaton (1913–1992), Canadian socialite, art collector and philanthropist
- Signy Fardal (born 1961), Norwegian editor-in-chief of Elle magazine
- Signe Gaupset (born 2005), Norwegian footballer
- Signe Giebelhausen (1811–1879), Danish-Norwegian actress
- Signe Häggman (1863–1911), Finnish pioneer of physical education of the disabled
- Signe Hammarsten-Jansson (1882–1970), Swedish-Finnish graphic artist
- Signe Hasso (1915–2002), Swedish actress
- Signe Hebbe (1837–1925), Swedish singer and actress
- Signý Hermannsdóttir (born 1979), Icelandic basketball player
- Signe Hofgaard (1901–1998), Norwegian dancer, choreographer and organizational leader
- Signe Horn Fuglesang (born 1938), Norwegian art historian and professor
- Signe Hornborg (1862–1916), Finnish architect (possibly the first qualified female architect)
- Signe Howell (born 1942), Norwegian social anthropologist
- Signe Iversen (born 1956), Norwegian Sami language consultant and children's author
- Signe Johansson-Engdahl (1905–2010), Swedish diver
- Signe Kivi (born 1957), Estonian textile artist and politician
- Signe Klinting (born 1990), Danish orienteer
- Signe Kongebro (born 1972), Danish architect and educator
- Signe Livbjerg (February 1980), Danish sport sailor
- Signe Lund (1868–1950), Norwegian composer
- Signe Nielsen, American landscape architect
- Signe Øye (born 1945), Norwegian politician
- Signe Paisjärv (1940–2016), Estonian table tennis player
- Signe Pierce (born 1989), American multimedia artist-performer
- Signe Relander (1886–1962), First Lady of Finland (1925–1931)
- Signe Rink (1836–1909), Danish writer and ethnologist
- Signe Ronka (born 1988), Latvian-Canadian figure skater
- Signe Salén (1871–1963), Swedish doctor
- Signe Scheel (1860–1942), Norwegian painter
- Signe Torborg Schmidt-Nielsen (1878–1959), Swedish-Norwegian physicist and nutritionist
- Signe Marie Stray Ryssdal (1924–2019), Norwegian lawyer and politician
- Signe Søes (born 1983), Danish orienteer
- Signe Marie Store (born 1995), Norwegian freestyle wrestler
- Signe Svendsen (born 1974), Danish singer
- Signe Swensson (1888–1974), Norwegian physician and politician
- Signe Toksvig (1891–1983), Danish writer
- Signe Tollefsen (born 1981), American-Dutch singer-songwriter
- Signe Toly Anderson (1941–2016), American singer of Jefferson Airplane
- Signe Trosten (born 1970), Norwegian biathlete
- Signe Veiteberg, Norwegian fashion model
- Signe Wenneberg (born 1968), Danish politician
- Signe Weisert (1923–2000), Norwegian politician
- Signe Wilkinson (born 1950), American editorial cartoonist
- Signe Wirff (1887–1956), Swedish actress
