= Bobath concept =

Approach to neurological rehabilitation

- Specialty: Neurological

The Bobath concept is an approach to neurological rehabilitation that is applied in patient assessment and treatment (such as with adults after stroke or children with cerebral palsy). The goal of applying the Bobath concept is to promote motor learning for efficient motor control in various environments, thereby improving participation and function. This is done through specific patient handling skills to guide patients through the initiation and completing of intended tasks. This approach to neurological rehabilitation is multidisciplinary, primarily involving physiotherapists, occupational therapists, and speech and language therapists. In the United States, the Bobath concept is also known as 'neuro-developmental treatment' (NDT).

The concept and its international tutors / instructors have embraced neuroscience and the developments in understanding motor control, motor learning, neuroplasticity and human movement science. They believe that this approach continues to develop.

The Bobath concept is named after its inventors: Berta Bobath (physiotherapist) and Karel Bobath (a psychiatrist/neurophysiologist). Their work focused mainly on patients with cerebral palsy and stroke. The main problems of these patient groups resulted in a loss of the standard postural reflex mechanism and regular movements. The Bobath concept was focused on regaining regular movements through re-education at its earliest inception. Since then, it has evolved to incorporate new information on neuroplasticity, motor learning, and motor control. Therapists that practice the Bobath concept today also embrace the goal of developing optimal movement patterns through the use of orthotics and appropriate compensations instead of aiming for ultimately "normal" movement patterns.

The Bobath Centre in Watford, UK is a specialist therapy, treatment & training facility and the home of the Bobath Concept.

== Stroke rehabilitation ==
In the Bobath Concept, postural control is the foundation on which patients begin to develop their skills. Patients undergoing this treatment typically learn how to control postures and movements and then progress to more difficult ones. Therapists analyze postures and movements and look for any abnormalities that may be present when asked to perform them. Examples of common abnormal movement patterns include obligatory synergy patterns. These patterns can be described as the process of trying to perform isolated movement of a particular limb but triggering the use of other typically uninvolved muscles (when compared to normal movement) in order to achieve movement. Obligatory synergy patterns can be further subdivided into flexion and extension synergy components for both the upper and lower extremities. This approach requires active participation from both the patient and the therapist. Depending on the patient, rehabilitation goals may work to improve any or all of the following: postural control, coordination of movement sequences, movement initiation, optimal body alignment, abnormal tone or muscle weakness. Treatment will therefore address both negative signs such as impaired postural control, and positive signs such as spasticity.

Intervention strategies and techniques for Bobath consist of therapeutic handling, facilitation, and activation of key points of control. Therapeutic handling is used in order to influence the quality of the patients' movements and incorporates both facilitation and inhibition. Facilitation is a key technique used by Bobath practitioners to promote motor learning. It is the use of sensory information (tactile cues through manual contacts, verbal directions) to reinforce weak movement patterns and discourage overactive ones. The appropriate provision of facilitation during the motor task is regulated in time, modality, intensity and withdrawal, all of which affect the outcome of motor learning. Inhibition can be described as reducing parts of movement/posture that are abnormal and interfere with normal performance. Key points of control generally refer to parts of the body that are advantageous when facilitating or inhibiting movement/posture.

Activities assigned by a physical therapist or occupational therapist to an individual who has suffered from a stroke are selected based on functional relevance and are varied in terms of difficulty and the environment in which they are performed. The use of the individual's less involved segments, also known as compensatory training strategies, are avoided. Carryover of functional activities in the home and community setting is largely attributed to patient, family and caregiver education.

== History ==
The Bobath Concepts' theoretical underpinning and practice is clearly documented in a contemporary book published by Wiley Blackman in 2009: Bobath Concept: Theory and Clinical Practice in Neurological Rehabilitation' written by the British Bobath Tutors Association (BBTA) and edited by Raine, Meadows, and Lynch-Ellerington. The chair of ACPIN (Association of Chartered Physiotherapists in Neurology) reviewed this book and concluded:- "I am not really sure that it is clear from the book what the Bobath approach actually is", "often the prose turns into jargon" and "this book will do little to quell the critics; in fact, it will no doubt give them more fuel for the fire".

== Research ==
Paci (2003) conducted an extensive critical appraisal of studies to determine the effectiveness of the Bobath concept for adults with hemiplegia following a stroke. Selected trials showed no evidence proving the effectiveness of the Bobath Concept as the optimal type of treatment. Paci (2003) recommended that standardized guidelines for treatment be identified and described and that further investigations are necessary to develop outcome measures concerning goals of the Bobath approach such as quality of motor performance.

Bobath therapy is nonstandardized as it responds, through clinical reasoning and the development of a clinical hypothesis, to the individual patient and their movement control problems. The decisions about specific treatment techniques are collaboratively made with the patient and are guided by the therapist through the use of goal setting and the development of close communication and interaction. Working to develop improved muscle tone appropriate to the task, the individual and the environment, will enable better alignment, and activation of movement, and allow for the recruitment of, for example, arm activity in functional situations within various positions.

A study by Lennon et al. concluded that even under idealized conditions (patients with optimal rehabilitation potential, advanced trained therapists, unlimited therapy input, and a movement analysis laboratory) the Bobath approach had no effect on the quality of gait for patients with a stroke.

== Institutions ==
The Neuro-Developmental Treatment Association (NDTA) was founded to carry on the Bobath's work; it offers certification in NDT for managing adults with stroke or brain trauma and for managing and treating children with cerebral palsy and other neuromotor disorders. People who have this certification sometimes are called "neurodevelopmentalists".

== Criticism ==
The concept that Bobath can "evolve" and still be called Bobath has been challenged by the president of the American Academy of Cerebral Palsy and Developmental Medicine and the chair of the UK Association of Chartered Physiotherapists in Neurology (ACPIN). These eminent physiotherapists believe that several of the key original teachings of the founders have now been abandoned, whilst the ideas/concepts of others (non Bobath therapists & scientists) have unjustifiably been given the name of Bobath.

There is a widespread use of the Bobath concept amongst therapists in stroke rehabilitation. Yet, a large review of randomized controlled trials (RCTs) of Bobath for stroke rehabilitation found only three instances of significant differences in favour of Bobath, yet 11 in favour of alternatives. The authors concluded that therapists should base their treatment methods on "evidence-based guidelines, accepted rules of motor learning, and biological mechanisms of functional recovery, rather than therapist preference for any named therapy approach". This review pointed out that the approach is now regarded as "obsolete" in some European countries and it is therefore no longer taught.

In 2018, a major review of upper limb interventions following stroke found significant positive effects for constraint and task specific-therapies and the supplementary use of biofeedback and electrical stimulation. However, they concluded that the use of Bobath therapy was not supported. Furthermore, a 2020 review of lower limb rehabilitation following stroke concluded that Bobath therapy was inferior to task specific training and that prioritising Bobath therapy over other interventions is not supported by current evidence.

In the UK, an NHS review of stroke rehabilitation by Professor Tyson concluded that "the strength of evidence that task-specific functional training and strength training is effective, while Bobath is not, indicates that a paradigm shift is needed in UK stroke physiotherapy..... it is increasingly difficult to justify the continued use of the Bobath concept or its associated techniques". More recently Professor Tyson and Dr Mepsted have both written comprehensive and critical reviews of Bobath/NDT methods, theory and effectiveness. See also an interesting exchange of letters between the above authors and Bobath tutors.

National evidence-based guidelines for stroke rehabilitation have been published for England, Netherlands, Canada, Australia, and New Zealand; yet in none of these is the Bobath approach recommended. Conversely, in 2016 the American Stroke Association concluded that although the effectiveness of NDT/Bobath (compared with other treatment approaches) had not been established that it still "may be considered" as a treatment option for mobility. This, however, was their lowest classification of acceptable treatment. Their two highest recommendation groups ("should be performed" and "reasonable to perform") contained a variety of treatments for which there was much better evidence. NDT/Bobath was not listed as an option for arm/hand rehabilitation.

Also, in 2016, the revised RCP guidelines for stroke made no mention of Bobath/NDT, whilst many alternatives were recommended. Importantly they stated that if a treatment was not mentioned, then it was not recommended and need not be funded. They also stated that therapists using such methods must objectively review their options in light of the evidence supporting the recommended alternatives. Furthermore, patients receiving such interventions should be informed that it was outside mainstream practice.

A highly significant 2021 "position paper" by the Academy of Neurologic Physical Therapy of the American Physical Therapy Association concluded that, despite its lack of an evidence base, NDT/Bobath methods were still favoured by some therapist in the USA. To overcome this problem, they described a range of strategies that will be implemented to encourage best evidence-based practices and de-implement traditional (NDT/Bobath) methods of working at both an individual and organizational level.

The Bobath (NDT) approach is also widely used on children with cerebral palsy (CP). However, when the effectiveness of interventions for the treatment of CP was reviewed by Novak et al. they concluded, "Consequently, there are no circumstances where any of the aims of NDT could not be achieved by a more effective treatment. Thus, on the grounds of wanting to do the best for children with CP, it is hard to rationalize a continued place for traditional NDT within clinical care". They consequently recommended "ceasing provision of the ever-popular NDT".

Bobath tutors have stated that RCTs are not suitable for evaluation of Bobath due to its complexity. However, they are routinely used to evaluate extremely complex intervention in areas such as psychology and social science. It has also been argued that Bobath is no more complex than alternative methods currently used in neurorehabilitation and that complexity of intervention is irrelevant because RCTs measure effectiveness not complexity of a treatment. Thus if Bobath methods produced better outcomes then RCTs would show it.

== See also ==
- Occupational therapy
- Physical therapy
- Speech and language pathology
- Brunnstrom Approach
- Frenkel exercises
