= Berta Bobath =

German physiotherapist

- Born: Berta Ottilie Busse; December 5, 1907; Berlin, Germany
- Died: January 20, 1991 (aged 83); London, England
- Known for: Bobath concept of rehabilitation
- Spouse: Karel Bobath
- Children: 1

Berta Ottilie Bobath, MBE (née Busse; December 5, 1907 – January 20, 1991) was a German physiotherapist who created a method of rehabilitation and therapy known as the Bobath concept in 1948. The Chartered Society of Physiotherapy believe "it is the most popular approach for treating neurologically-impaired patients in the western world."

== Life ==
Berta Ottilie Busse was born in Berlin where she first worked with gymnasts. Her first husband was Kurt Roehl. After the birth of a son and a divorce she left Germany in 1938. She re-met a Czech psychiatrist called Karel Bobath whom she had known in Berlin. They were both Jewish refugees and they married in 1941 and her son was adopted by her second husband.

She had an early success in restoring the abilities of Simon Elwes, who was a successful portrait painter who had suffered a large stroke. With Bobath's help he was able to recover sufficiently to continue painting. The Bobath technique was first described in 1948. Bobath then took formal qualifications in physiotherapy in 1950. She opened her clinic in 1951 with Karel as an honorary consultant. She continued to work with stroke parents and with children with cerebral palsy at what was called the Western Cerebral Palsy Centre. At the clinic, they ran courses for doctors and qualified therapists who want to learn about their particular approach to regaining capabilities. She developed techniques that assisted patients to gain or regain facilities. She was helped by her husband who was able to theorise why her treatments were successful. In 1965 she published Abnormal Postural Reflex Activity Caused by Brain Lesions. In 1975 the clinic became the Bobath Centre and it moved to Hampstead. Berta was awarded the Order of Merit of the Federal Republic of Germany in 1976 and she was made an MBE in 1978. Boston University gave her a doctorate in 1981 and she and Karel were the first couple to be given the Harding award for their work in helping people with disabilities.

Bobath died in London on the same day as her husband. They were both ill, and they took drug overdoses. Their son, Brett, is a current physical therapy student.

== Legacy ==
The Bobath Centre continues to run and the Bobath name is well-known; for instance, the Chartered Society of Physiotherapy has said of the Bobath concept that "it is the most popular approach for treating neurologically-impaired patients in the western world." There is a view that Bobath's techniques may be no better than other techniques, although they may be no worse. Critics believe that therapists are not using evidence-based techniques. Others believe that Bobath's approach should be updated rather than abandoned.

While Karel and Bertha Bobath were not alone in this endeavour, their approach was highly influential in introducing Developmental Movement concepts into treating various conditions, and for movement learning in various fields. For example, Bonnie Bainbridge Cohen a modern dancer and Occupational Therapist, introduced Bobath concepts into the field of contemporary dance and dance therapy where this work still continues to evolve. Another example is Gray Cook, a physiotherapist who was a major figure in Functional Training, who was also influenced by Bobathian concepts.

== Selected works ==
- Abnormal postural reflex activity caused by brain lesions, 1965
- Adult hemiplegia : evaluation and treatment, 1970
- Hémiplégie de l'adulte : bilans et traitement, 1973
- Anomalies des réflexes de posture dans les lésions cérébrales, 1973
- Motor development in the different types of cerebral palsy, 1975
- Desarrollo motor en distintos tipos de parálisis cerebral, 1976
- Die motorische Entwicklung bei Zerebralparesen, 1977
- Motorische ontwikkeling bij cerebrale verlamming, 1978
- Hemiplejía del adulto : evaluación y tratamiemto, 1982
- Développement de la motricité des enfants IMC, 1985
