= Brunström =

Brunström is a Swedish surname, written Brunstrom abroad. Notable people with this surname include:

- Carolina Brunström (1803–1855), Swedish ballerina
- Johan Brunström (born 1980), Swedish tennis player
- Richard Brunstrom (born 1954), British police officer
- Jane Carr (actress, born 1909), born Brunstrom
