= Skew deviation =

Vertical misalignment of the eyes

Skew deviation is an unusual ocular deviation (strabismus), wherein the eyes move upward (hypertropia) in opposite directions. Skew deviation is caused by abnormal prenuclear vestibular input to the ocular motor nuclei, most commonly due to brainstem or cerebellar stroke. Other causes include multiple sclerosis and head trauma. Skew deviation is usually characterized by torticollis (head tilting) and binocular torsion. The exact pathophysiology of skew deviation remains incompletely understood. Skew deviation appears to be a perturbation of the ocular tilt reaction, which is itself is most likely a vestigial righting response used to keep fish and other lateral-eyed animals properly oriented.

There are three types of skew deviations:

Type 1: Upward deviation of both eyes; sound-induced vestibular symptoms; both eyes show counterclockwise rotary upward rotation

Type 2: Hypertropia in one eye; dorsolateral medullary infarctions; excyclotropia in the ipsilateral eye; hypertropia in the contralateral eye

Type 3: Simultaneous hypertropia one eye and hypotropia in the other eye; upper brainstem lesion
