= Signe Häggman =

Finnish pedagogue

Signe Amalia Häggman (29 April 1863, Jyväskylä -26 June 1911, Helsinki), was a Finnish pedagogue. She is regarded as a pioneer within the physical education of disabled people in Finland.

== Life ==
Häggman was educated at Jyväskylä seminary and worked as a teacher in Oulu and Lapua. In 1889, she was given a scholarship from the state to study the physical education of disabled people in Copenhagen. On her return to Finland, she was appointed as the first manager and educator of the newly founded professional school for disabled people in Helsinki, and served in the position from 1890 until 1911. During the period, she was in effect responsible for the education of disabled people in Finland.
