= Brunnstrom Approach =

Approach to recover from hemiplegia after a stroke

- Specialty: Occupational and physical therapy

The Brunnstrom Approach sets out a sequence of stages of recovery from hemiplegia after a stroke. It was developed by the Swedish physical therapist Signe Brunnström, and emphasises the synergic pattern of movement which develops during recovery. This approach encourages development of flexor and extensor synergies during early recovery, with the intention that synergic activation of muscles will, with training, transition into voluntary activation of movements.

== Sequential motor recovery following stroke ==
The Brunnstrom Approach follows six proposed stages of sequential motor recovery after a stroke. A patient can plateau at any of these stages, but will generally follow this sequence if he or she makes a full recovery. The variability found between patients depends on the location and severity of the lesion, and the potential for adaptation.

Brunnstrom (1966, 1970) and Sawner (1992) also described the process of recovery following stroke-induced hemiplegia. The process was divided into a number of stages:

1. Flaccidity (immediately after the onset)
2. No "voluntary" movements on the affected side can be initiated
3. Spasticity appears
4. Basic synergy patterns appear
5. Minimal voluntary movements may be present
6. Patient gains voluntary control over synergies
7. Increase in spasticity
8. Some movement patterns out of synergy are mastered (synergy patterns still predominate)
9. Decrease in spasticity
10. If progress continues, more complex movement combinations are learned as the basic synergies lose their dominance over motor acts
11. Further decrease in spasticity
12. Disappearance of spasticity
13. Individual joint movements become possible and coordination approaches normal
14. Normal function is restored

The 6 stages are as follows:

Stage	Description
1	Immediately following a stroke there is a period of flaccidity whereby no movement of the limbs on the affected side occurs.
2	Recovery begins with developing spasticity, increased reflexes and synergic movement patterns termed obligatory synergies. These obligatory synergies may manifest with the inclusion of all or only part of the synergic movement pattern and they occur as a result of reactions to stimuli or minimal movement responses.
3	Spasticity becomes more pronounced and obligatory synergies become strong. The patient gains voluntary control through the synergy pattern, but may have a limited range within it.
4	Spasticity and the influence of synergy begins to decline and the patient is able to move with less restrictions. The ease of these movements progresses from difficult to easy within this stage.
5	Spasticity continues to decline, and there is a greater ability for the patient to move freely from the synergy pattern. Here the patient is also able to demonstrate isolated joint movements, and more complex movement combinations.
6	Spasticity is no longer apparent, allowing near-normal to normal movement and coordination.

== Assessment methods ==
The six component stages of the Brunnstrom Approach have influenced the development of a variety of standardized assessment methods used by physiotherapists and occupational therapists to evaluate and track the progress of persons recovering from stroke. The Fugl Meyer Assessment of Physical Performance (FMA) is an example of one widely used scale. The FMA consists of five sub-scales that relate to various aspects of a patient's upper and lower extremity, and the sub-scales are as follows:

1. Motor
2. Balance
3. Sensation
4. Joint Range of Motion
5. Pain

Each component of the FMA may be evaluated and scored individually or, a total possible summative score for all 5 sub-scales of 226 may be used to track a patient's degree of recovery.

The influence of the Brunnstrom Approach on the development of the FMA is most evident within the Motor sub-scale for both the upper and lower extremity where there is a strong emphasis on the evaluation of muscle synergies.
