= Signe Brunnström =

Swedish-American physiotherapist, scientist, and educator

Signe Brunnstrom (birth name: Anna Signe Sofia Brunnstrom; 1898–1988) was a Swedish-American physiotherapist, scientist and educator. She is best known for her discovery of the sequence of stages of recovery from hemiplegia after stroke, which later came to be known as Brunnstrom Approach. Brunnstrom is also known for her observations in weight-bearing of the thigh and foot.

== Early life ==
Brunnstrom was born in the military castle of Stockholm on 1 January 1898. She was the second daughter of Captain Edwin Brunnstrom, a military man, and Hedwig Lidman. At age 16, she went to Upsala College and studied science, geography, history and gymnastics. In 1917, she gained her school-leaving certificate and joined the Royal Institute of Gymnastics in Stockholm. Here, she learnt medical exercises, which were known as 'Swedish exercises' at that time. In 1919, she graduated from the Institute with the title 'Gymnastikdirektor'. In 1920, she moved to Switzerland and established a 'Sjugymnastik Institut' a year later in Lucerne. She had a reputation in treating children with scoliosis and poliomyelitis. She moved to New York in 1927 and started working at the 'Hospital for the Ruptured and Crippled' as an exercise therapist. She also worked as the instructor in the gymnasium of Metropolitan Life Insurance Company. She is known for her work in exercise physiotherapy for working women. She joined Barnard College in 1931 and studied chemistry and English. She later obtained a master's degree in education and physical therapy from New York University. She became an American citizen in 1934. She died in 1988 in the USA.

== Scientific work ==
She published her first article, Faulty Weight Bearing with Special Reference to the position of the Thigh and the foot in 1935. Thereafter, she published several research papers, book reviews, films and textbooks on prosthetic training, kinesiology and movement therapy. She has also translated the works of famous American and European kinesiologists.

== Books ==
- Movement Therapy in Hemiplegia : A neurophysiological approach, 1970
- Training of the Lower Extremity Amputee (co-authored with Donald Kerr), 1956
- Clinical Kinesiology, 1972
- Brunnstrom's clinical kinesiology, 1983
