= Subjective visual vertical =

Subjective Visual Vertical (SVV) is a diagnostic test of the inner ear to assess a patient's perception of verticality and detect if there are any signs of an abnormal tilt that may cause dizziness or vertigo. It investigates the function of the utricle, one of two otolith organs located in the vertebrate inner ear, to evaluate the perception of verticality.

As its name suggests, the test is subjective and cannot directly diagnose Acute Vestibular Syndrome (AVS), Ménière's disease, vestibular migraine, vestibular neuritis, or other central nervous system pathologies.

== Technique and usage ==
This test is conducted in various ways. One method involves a dark room where a patient sits and adjusts a remotely controlled laser projection line to his perceived horizontal or vertical position. Sometimes this involves a dynamic element like a rotary chair. Another method, known as the bucket test, uses a bucket over a patient's head. The clinician rotates the bucket until a line at the bottom of the bucket is perceived to be vertical. The Subjective Virtual Visual goggle is a trademarked method, which employs a goggle displaying a vertical line and a hand-held remote. It allows the clinician to administer the test while tilting the patient's head. It is used for the following objectives:
