= Giancarlo =

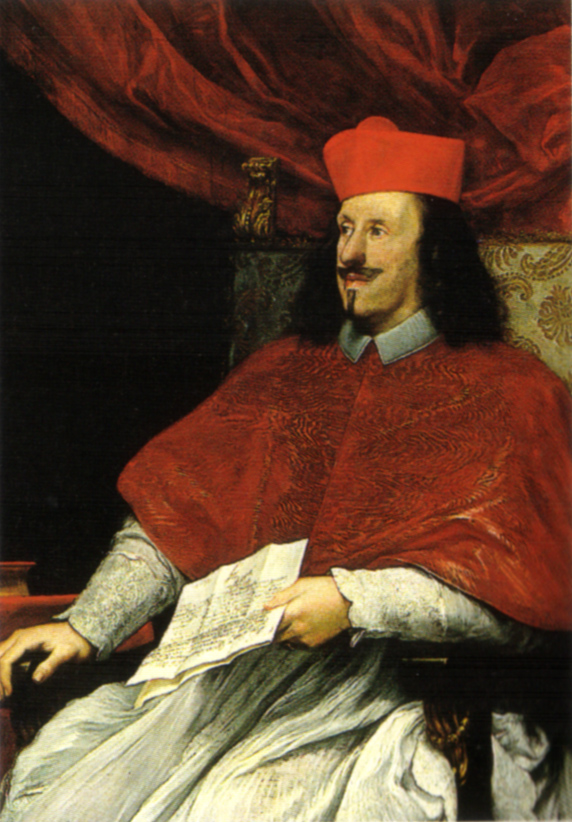
- Giancarlo de' Medici
- Gender: Male
- Language: Italian

Other gender
- Feminine: Giovanna Carla or Giannacarla

Origin
- Origin: Italy

Other names
- Variant forms: Gian Carlo, Gianni Carlo
- Related names: Giovanni Carlo

Giancarlo or Gian Carlo is a masculine double name, composed of the Italian names Giovanni and Carlo. Giancarlo or Gian Carlo is an apocopated and blended form of the name Giovanni Carlo. Giancarlo is the equivalent form of the English double name John Charles.

The name Giancarlo is one of the most popular double names in the Italian language. It has also been spelled as Giovanni Carlo, Giovan Carlo, Gian Carlo, Gianni Carlo, among others.

== List ==
=== A ===
- Giancarlo Agazzi (1933–1995), Italian ice hockey player
- Giancarlo Alessandrelli (born 1952), Italian footballer
- Giancarlo Alessandrini (born 1950), Italian comic artist
- Giancarlo Alvarado (born 1978), Puerto Rican baseball player
- Giancarlo Antognoni (born 1954), Italian footballer
- Giancarlo Aragona (born 1942), Italian diplomat
- Giancarlo Astrua (1927–2010), Italian road bicycle racer

=== B ===
- Giancarlo Bacci (1931–2014), Italian footballer
- Giancarlo Badessi (1928–2011), Italian actor
- Giancarlo Baghetti (1934–1995), Italian Formula One driver
- Giancarlo Bellini (born 1945), Italian road bicycle racer
- Giancarlo Berardi (born 1949), Italian comic book writer
- Giancarlo Bercellino (born 1941), Italian footballer
- Giancarlo Bergamelli (born 1974), Italian alpine skier
- Giancarlo Bergamini (1926–2020), Italian fencer
- Giancarlo Bigazzi (1940–2012), Italian music producer
- Giancarlo Bocchi, Italian filmmaker, producer, and writer
- Giancarlo Boriani (1894–1962), Italian sports shooter
- Giancarlo Brusati (1910–2001), Italian fencer

=== C ===
- Giancarlo Cadé (1930–2013), Italian footballer and coach
- Giancarlo Caltabiano (born 1967), Canadian actor
- Giancarlo Camolese (born 1961), Italian footballer
- Giancarlo Canavesio (born 1968), Italian film producer
- Giancarlo Cantelmi (1926–2023), Italian lawyer and politician
- Giancarlo Carloni (born 1947), Italian footballer
- Giancarlo Carmona (born 1985), Peruvian footballer
- Giancarlo Ceccarelli (born 1956), Italian footballer
- Giancarlo Cella (1940–2026), Italian footballer and coach
- Giancarlo Centi (born 1959), Italian footballer and coach
- Giancarlo Chiaramello (born 1939), Italian composer
- Giancarlo Cito (1945–2025), Italian politician and entrepreneur
- Giancarlo Cobelli (1929–2012), Italian actor and stage director
- Giancarlo Commare (born 1991), Italian actor
- Giancarlo Conta (born 1949), Italian politician
- Giancarlo Coraggio (born 1940), Italian judge
- Giancarlo Corradini (born 1961), Italian footballer and coach

=== D ===
- Giancarlo da Silva Moro (born 1982), Brazilian footballer
- Giancarlo Dametto (born 1959), Italian volleyball player
- Giancarlo Danova (1938–2014), Italian footballer
- Giancarlo de' Medici (1611–1663), Italian cardinal
- Giancarlo De Carlo (1919–2015), Italian architect
- Giancarlo De Cataldo (born 1956), Italian crime novelist, screenwriter and dramatist
- Giancarlo De Sisti (born 1943), Italian footballer and coach
- Giancarlo del Monaco (born 1943), Italian stage director
- Giancarlo Dellagiovanna (born 1961), Italian prelate of the Catholic Church
- Giancarlo Dettori (1932–2026), Italian actor
- Giancarlo Devasini (born 1964), Italian businessman and former physician
- Giancarlo DiTrapano (1974–2021), American publisher

=== E ===
- Giancarlo Esposito (born 1958), American actor

=== F ===
- Giancarlo Falappa (born 1963), Italian motorcycle road racer
- Giancarlo Favarin (born 1958), Italian football manager and former player
- Giancarlo Ferrari (born 1942), Italian archer
- Giancarlo Ferretti (born 1941), Italian road bicycle racer and team manager
- Giancarlo Filippini (born 1968), Italian former footballer
- Giancarlo Fisichella (born 1973), Italian Formula One driver
- Giancarlo Flati (born 1953), Italian painter

=== G ===
- Giancarlo Galan (born 1956), Italian politician
- Giancarlo Gallifuoco (born 1994), Australian footballer
- Giancarlo Genta (born 1948), Italian professor of machine design and construction
- Giancarlo Gentilini (1929–2025), Italian politician
- Giancarlo Ghirardi (1935–2018), Italian physicist
- Giancarlo Giammetti (born 1942), Italian fashion entrepreneur
- Giancarlo Giannini (born 1942), Italian actor
- Giancarlo Giorgetti (born 1966), Italian politician
- Giancarlo Giudice (born 1952), Italian serial killer, known as The Monster of Turin
- Giancarlo Golzi (1952–2015), Italian drummer and songwriter, a founding member of the Genoan band Matia Bazar
- Giancarlo González (born 1988), Costa Rican footballer
- Giancarlo Gramolazzo (1945–2010), Italian priest and exorcist
- Giancarlo Guerrero (born 1969), Costa Rican music director
- Giancarlo Guerrini (1939–2025), Italian water polo player
- Giancarlo Gutierrez (1932–2025), Italian equestrian

=== I ===
- Giancarlo Ibarguen (born 1963), Guatemalan businessman and academic
- Giancarlo Impiglia, Italian-American visual artist
- Giancarlo Improta (born 1987), Italian footballer
- Giancarlo Italiano (born 1983), Australian association football manager

=== J ===
- Giancarlo Judica Cordiglia (born 1971), Italian actor

=== L ===
- Giancarlo Ligabue (1931–2015), Italian palaeontologist and politician
- Giancarlo Livraghi (1927–2014), Italian author and advertising executive
- Giancarlo Luzzani (1912–date of death unknown), Swiss field hockey player

=== M ===
- Giancarlo Magalli (born 1947), Italian television writer and presenter
- Giancarlo Maldonado (born 1982), Venezuelan footballer
- Giancarlo Marinelli (1915–1987), Italian basketball player
- Giancarlo Marocchi (born 1965), Italian footballer
- Giancarlo Martini (1947–2013), Italian Formula One driver
- Giancarlo Mazzanti (born 1963), Colombian architect
- Giancarlo Meo, Italian record producer
- Giancarlo Minardi (born 1947), Italian car racer and founder of the Formula One team Minardi
- Giancarlo Monsalve (born 1982), Chilean tenor
- Giancarlo Morolli, Italian philatelist
- Giancarlo Morresi (1944–2019), Italian modern pentathlete

=== N ===
- Giancarlo Neri (born 1955), Italian sculptor

=== P ===
- Giancarlo Pagliarini (born 1942), Italian politician
- Giancarlo Pajetta (1911–1990), Italian politician
- Giancarlo Pallavicini (born 1931), Italian economist
- Giancarlo Pantano (born 1977), Italian footballer
- Giancarlo Parretti (born 1941), Italian financier
- Giancarlo Pasinato (born 1956), Italian footballer and coach
- Giancarlo Pasquini (politician) (1937–2025), Italian politician
- Giancarlo Pepeu (1930–2021) Italian Emeritus Professor of Pharmacology
- Giancarlo Perini (born 1959), Italian road bicycle racer
- Giancarlo Peris (born 1941), Italian track athlete
- Giancarlo Petrazzuolo (born 1980), Italian tennis player
- Giancarlo Pittelli, Italian criminal and former lawyer and politician
- Giancarlo Polidori (born 1943), Italian road bicycle racer
- Giancarlo Politi (1937–2026), Italian art critic and publisher
- Giancarlo Prete (1943–2001), Italian actor
- Giancarlo Previato (born 1993), Brazilian footballer
- Giancarlo Primo (1924–2005), Italian basketball player and coach

=== R ===
- Giancarlo Rastelli (1934–1970), Italian cardiac surgeon
- Giancarlo Rebizzi (born 1933), Italian footballer
- Giancarlo Ronchetti (1913–unknown), Italian bobsledder
- Giancarlo Rossi (1943–2025), Italian physicist
- Gian-Carlo Rota (1932–1999), Italian born-American mathematician and philosopher

=== S ===
- Giancarlo "Gian" Sammarco (born 1970), English nurse and former child actor
- Giancarlo Santalmassi (1941–2025), Italian journalist and radio presenter
- Giancarlo Santi (1939–2021), Italian director and screenwriter
- Giancarlo Sbragia (1926–1994), Italian actor
- Giancarlo Schiaffini, Italian jazz trombonist
- Giancarlo Scottà (born 1953), Italian politician
- Giancarlo Serenelli (born 1981), Venezuelan racing driver
- Giancarlo Siani (1959–1985), Italian crime reporter
- Giancarlo Snidaro (born 1954), Italian footballer
- Giancarlo Stanton (born 1989), American baseball player

=== T ===
- Giancarlo Tei (born 1961), Italian politician
- Giancarlo Tesini (1929–2023), Italian politician

=== U ===
- Giancarlo Umaña (born 1982), Colombian football manager and former player

=== V ===
- Giancarlo Vallauri (1882–1957), Italian engineer, academic and naval officer
- Giancarlo Venturini, Italian fashion designer and artist
- Giancarlo Vilarinho (born 1992), Brazilian race car driver
- Giancarlo Vitali (1926–2011), Italian footballer and manager
- Giancarlo Vitali (painter) (1929–2018), Italian painter
- Giancarlo Volpe (born 1974), American animator and director

=== W ===
- Gian-Carlo Wick (1909–1992), Italian theoretical physicist

=== Z ===
- Giancarlo Zagni (1926–2013), Italian director and screenwriter
- Giancarlo Zolezzi (born 1981), Chilean swimmer

== See also ==
- John (first name)
- Gian
- Gian Carlo
- Gian-Carlo
- Giovanni (name)
- Juan Carlos
- Giancarla Trevisan
