= Giovanni Carlo =

Giovanni Carlo is a blended masculine given name that combines Giovanni and Carlo that is often shortened to Gian Carlo, Giancarlo, or Gian-Carlo. Notable people with this name include the following:

- Giovanni Carlo Aliberti, (1670 - 1727), Italian painter
- Giovanni Carlo Antonelli (1612 – 1694), Italian Roman Catholic prelate
- Giovanni Carlo Bandi (1709 – 1784), Italian Cardinal
- Giovanni Carlo Bevilacqua (1775 – 1849), Italian painter
- Giovanni Carlo Boschi (1715 – 1788), Italian clergyman
- Giovanni Carlo Coppola (?? – 1606), Italian Roman Catholic prelate
- Giovanni Carlo Doria (1576-1625), Italian art collector
- Giovanni Carlo Galli-Bibiena (1717 - 1760), Italian architect and designer
- Giovanni Carlo Maria Clari (1677 – 1754), Italian musical composer and maestro di cappella
- Giovanni Carlo Tramontano, Count of Matera (1451 – 1514), Italian nobleman
