= Amputation =

Medical procedure that removes a part of the body

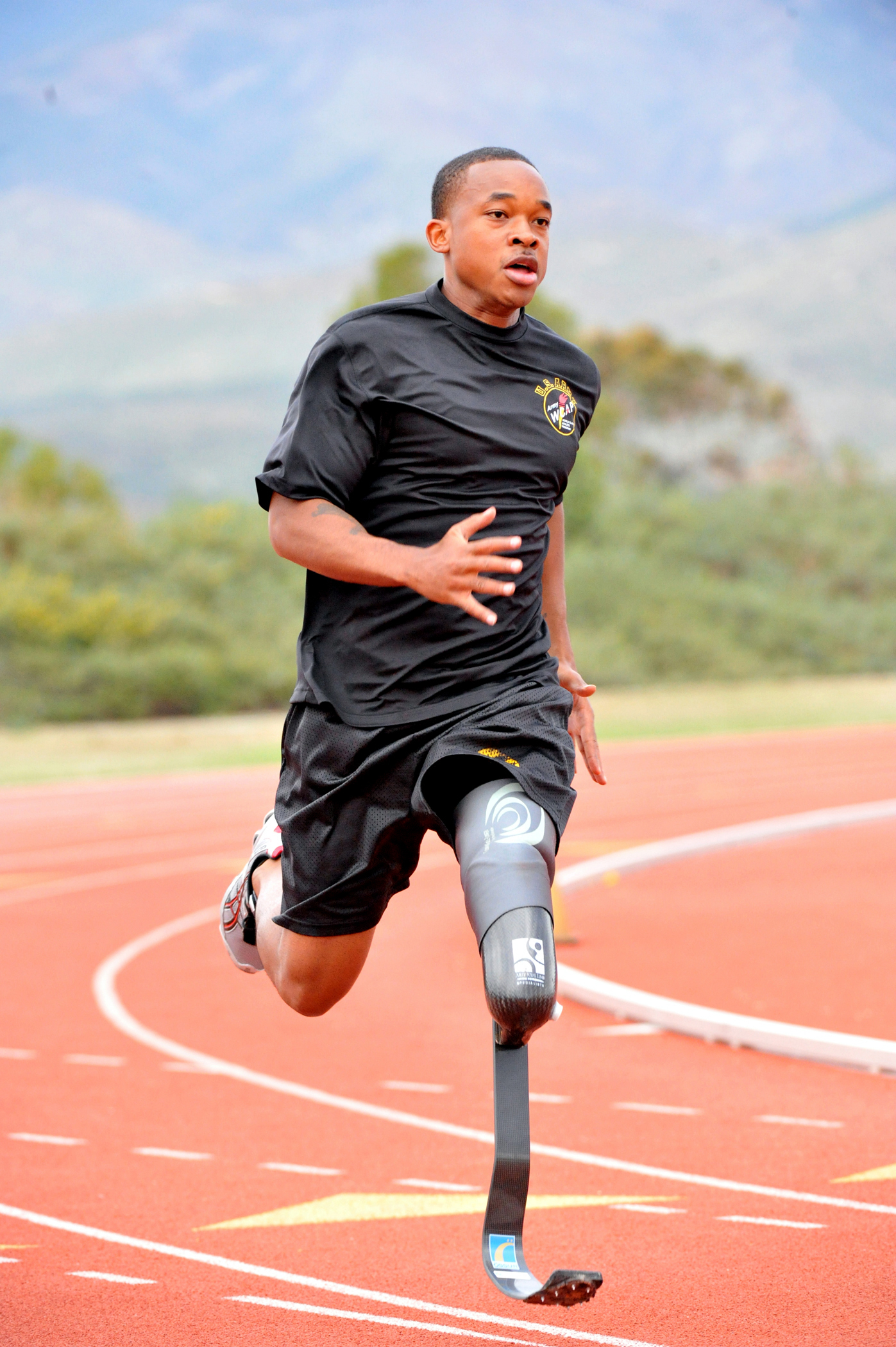
- An amputee running with a blade prosthetic
- Specialty: Surgery Physical medicine and rehabilitation Emergency medicine
- Complications: Phantom limb syndrome
- Causes: Trauma or intentional as part of surgery and sometimes corporal punishment

Amputation is the removal of a limb or other body part by trauma, medical illness, or surgery. As a surgical measure, it is used to control pain or a disease process in the affected limb, such as malignancy or gangrene. In some cases, it is carried out on individuals as a preventive surgery for such problems. A special case is that of congenital amputation, a congenital disorder, where fetal limbs have been cut off by constrictive bands. In some countries, judicial amputation is currently used to punish people who commit crimes. Amputation has also been used as a tactic in war and acts of terrorism; it may also occur as a war injury. In some cultures and religions, minor amputations or mutilations are considered a ritual accomplishment. When done by a person, the person executing the amputation is an amputator. The oldest evidence of this practice comes from a skeleton found buried in Liang Tebo cave, East Kalimantan, Indonesian Borneo dating back to at least 31,000 years ago, where it was done when the amputee was a young child. A prosthesis or a bioelectric replantation may restore sensation of the amputated limb.

== Types ==
=== Leg ===
Lower limb amputations can be divided into two broad categories: minor and major amputations. Minor amputations generally refer to the amputation of digits. Major amputations are commonly below-knee- or above-knee amputations. Common partial foot amputations include the Chopart, Lisfranc, and ray amputations.

Common forms of ankle disarticulations include Pyrogoff, Boyd, and Syme amputations. A less common major amputation is the Van Nes rotation, or rotationplasty, i.e. the turning around and reattachment of the foot to allow the ankle joint to take over the function of the knee.

Types of amputations include:

An above-knee amputation

partial foot amputation
amputation of the lower limb distal to the ankle joint
ankle disarticulation
amputation of the lower limb at the ankle joint
trans-tibial amputation
amputation of the lower limb between the knee joint and the ankle joint, commonly referred to as a below-knee amputation
knee disarticulation
amputation of the lower limb at the knee joint
trans-femoral amputation
amputation of the lower limb between the hip joint and the knee joint, commonly referred to an above-knee amputation
hip disarticulation
amputation of the lower limb at the hip joint
trans-pelvic disarticulation
amputation of the whole lower limb together with all or part of the pelvis, also known as a hemipelvectomy or hindquarter amputation

=== Arm ===
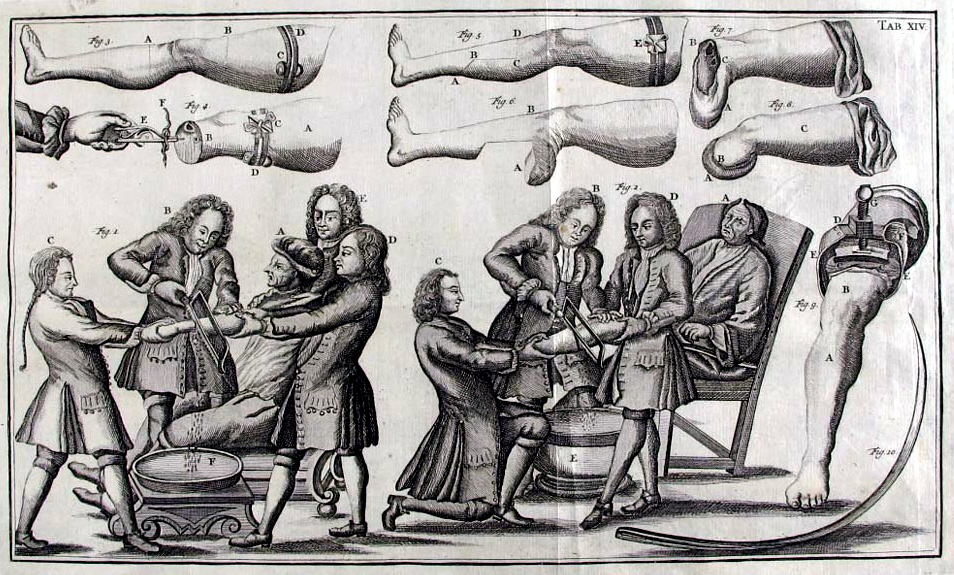
The 18th century guide to amputations

Types of upper extremity amputations include:

- partial hand amputation
- wrist disarticulation
- trans-radial amputation, commonly referred to as below-elbow or forearm amputation
- elbow disarticulation
- trans-humeral amputation, commonly referred to as above-elbow amputation
- shoulder disarticulation
- forequarter amputation

A variant of the trans-radial amputation is the Krukenberg procedure in which the radius and ulna are used to create a stump capable of a pincer action.

=== Other ===
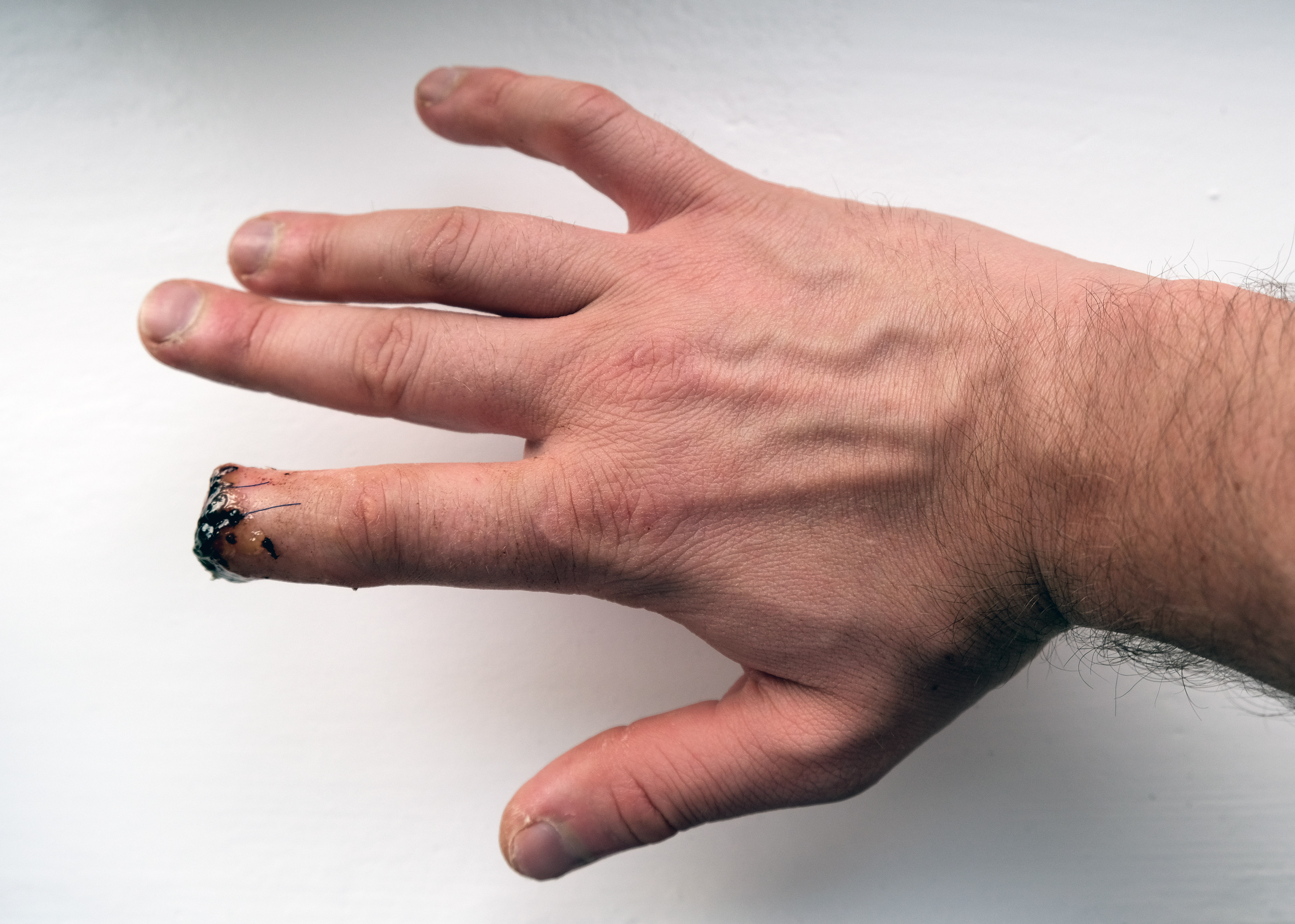
Partial amputation of index finger

- Facial amputations include but are not limited to:
  - amputation of the ears
  - amputation of the nose (rhinotomy)
  - amputation of the tongue (glossectomy)
  - amputation of the eyes (enucleation)
  - amputation of the teeth (Dental evulsion). Removal of teeth, mainly incisors, is or was practiced by some cultures for ritual purposes (for instance in the Iberomaurusian culture of Neolithic North Africa).
- Breasts:
  - amputation of the breasts (mastectomy)
- Genitals:
  - amputation of the testicles (orchiectomy)
  - amputation of the penis (penectomy)
  - amputation of the foreskin (circumcision)
  - amputation of the clitoris (clitoridectomy)
  - amputation of the vulva (vulvectomy)
- Radicals:
  - Amputation of the waist (hemicorporectomy)
  - Amputation of the head (decapitation)

Genital modification and mutilation may involve amputating tissue, although not necessarily as a result of injury or disease.

Laryngectomy is the amputation of the larynx.

=== Self-amputation ===
In some rare cases when a person has become trapped in a deserted place, with no means of communication or hope of rescue, the victim has amputated their own limb. The most notable case of this is Aron Ralston, a hiker who amputated his own right forearm after it was pinned by a boulder in a hiking accident and he was unable to free himself for over five days.

Body integrity dysphoria is a rare condition in which an individual feels compelled to remove one or more of their body parts, usually a limb. In some cases, that individual may take drastic measures to remove the offending appendages, either by causing irreparable damage to the limb so that medical intervention cannot save the limb, or by causing the limb to be severed.

=== Urgent ===
In surgery, a guillotine amputation is an amputation performed without closure of the skin in an urgent setting. Typical indications include catastrophic trauma or infection control in the setting of infected gangrene. A guillotine amputation is typically followed by a more time-consuming, definitive amputation such as an above or below knee amputation.

== Causes ==
=== Circulatory disorders ===
- Diabetic vasculopathy
- Sepsis with peripheral necrosis
- Peripheral artery disease which can lead to gangrene
- A severe deep vein thrombosis (phlegmasia cerulea dolens) can cause compartment syndrome and gangrene

=== Neoplasm ===
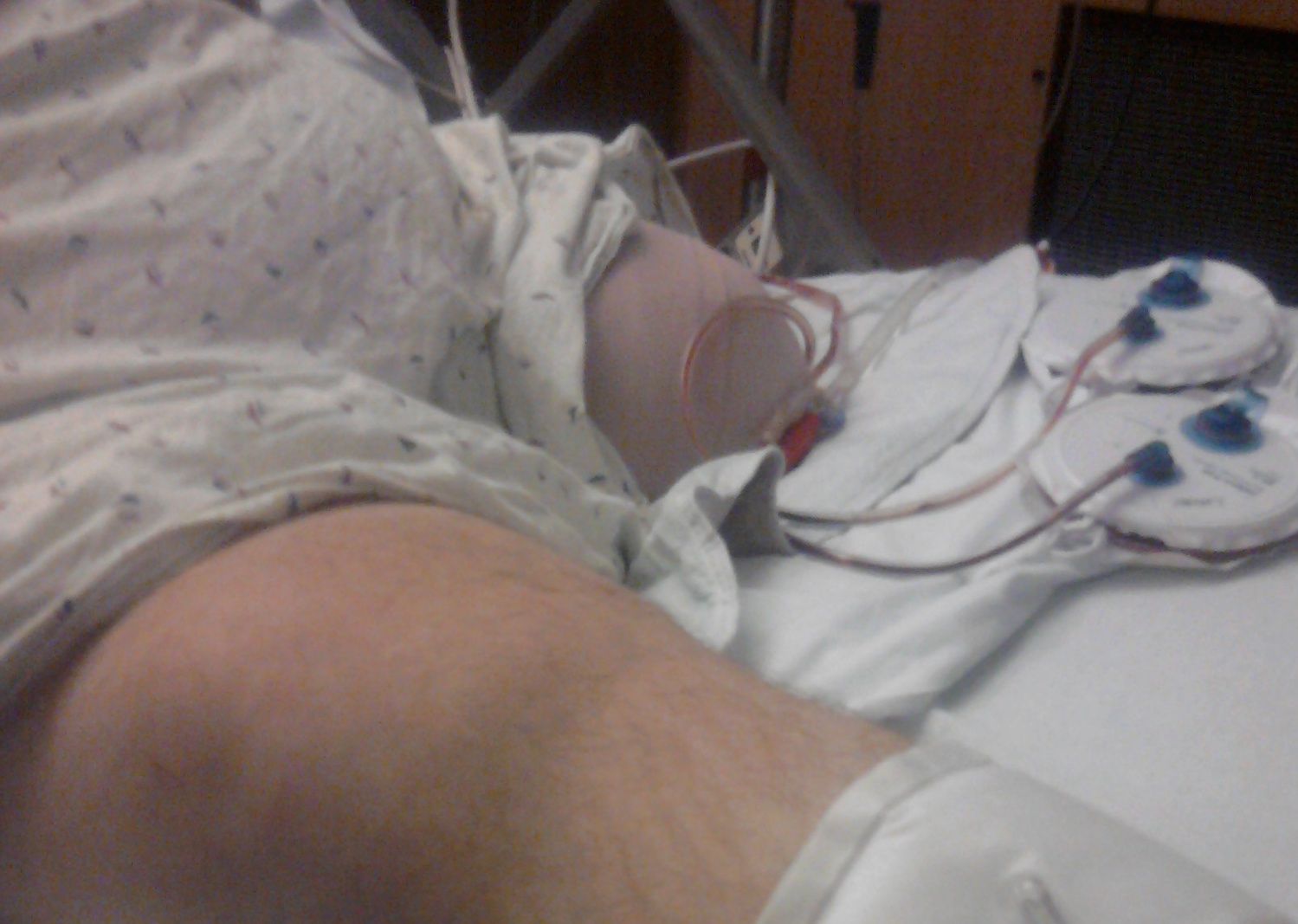
Transfemoral amputation due to liposarcoma

- Cancerous bone or soft tissue tumors (e.g. osteosarcoma, chondrosarcoma, fibrosarcoma, epithelioid sarcoma, Ewing's sarcoma, synovial sarcoma, sacrococcygeal teratoma, liposarcoma), melanoma

=== Trauma ===
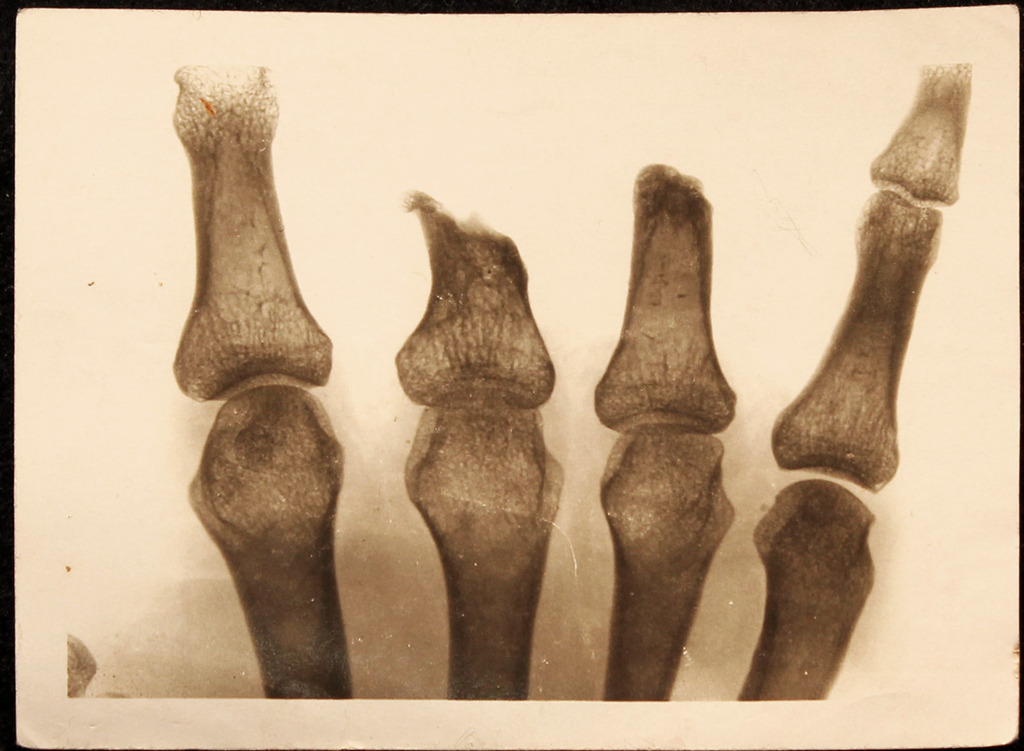
Three fingers from a soldier's right hand were traumatically amputated during World War I.

- Severe limb injuries in which the efforts to save the limb fail or the limb cannot be saved.
- Traumatic amputation (an unexpected amputation that occurs at the scene of an accident, where the limb is partially or entirely severed as a direct result of the accident, for example, a finger that is severed from the blade of a table saw)
- Amputation in utero (Amniotic band)

=== Congenital anomalies ===
- Deformities of digits and/or limbs (e.g., proximal femoral focal deficiency, Fibular hemimelia)
- Extra digits and/or limbs (e.g., polydactyly)

=== Infection ===
- Animal bites
- Bubonic plague
- Diabetic foot infections
- Gangrene
- Gas gangrene
- Influenza A Virus
- Legionella
- Meningococcal meningitis
- Necrosis
- Necrotizing fasciitis
- Osteomyelitis (bone infection)
- Sepsis
- Streptococcus
- Trench foot
- Vibrio vulnificus

=== Frostbite ===
Frostbite is a cold-related injury occurring when an area (typically a limb or other extremity) is exposed to extreme low temperatures, causing the freezing of the skin or other tissues. Its pathophysiology involves the formation of ice crystals upon freezing and blood clots upon thawing, leading to cell damage and cell death. Treatment of severe frostbite may require surgical amputation of the affected tissue or limb; if there is deep injury autoamputation may occur.

=== Athletic performance ===
Sometimes professional athletes may choose to have a non-essential digit amputated to relieve chronic pain and impaired performance.

- Australian Rules footballer Daniel Chick elected to have his left ring finger amputated as chronic pain and injury was limiting his performance.
- Rugby union player Jone Tawake also had a finger removed.
- National Football League safety Ronnie Lott had the tip of his little finger removed after it was damaged in the 1985 NFL season.

=== Criminal penalties ===
- According to Quran 5:38, the punishment for stealing is the amputation of the hand. Under Sharia law, after repeated offense, the foot may also be cut off. This is still in practice today in countries like Brunei, the United Arab Emirates, Iran, Saudi Arabia, Yemen, and 11 of the 36 states within Nigeria.
- Cross-amputation is one of the Hudud punishments prescribed under Islamic jurisprudence (Sharia law) and involves cutting off the right hand and left foot of the alleged transgressor. The scriptural authority for the double amputation procedure is in the Quran (surah 5.33–34) which stipulates:
  The punishment of those who wage war against Allah and His Messenger, and strive with might for mischief through the land is execution or crucifixion, or cutting of hands and feet from opposite sides, or exile from the land. As for the thief, male or female, cut off their hands and feet from opposite ends in recompense for what they have committed.
  The severe punishment, for "highway robbery (hirabah, qat' al-tariq) and civil disturbance against Islam", is usually carried out in a single session in public, without anaesthetic and using a sword. The ancient punishment is practised in Islamic countries such as Saudi Arabia, Sudan, Somalia, Mauritania, the Maldives, Iran, Afghanistan (under Taliban rule), and Yemen.
- In 1779, Thomas Jefferson proposed a bill to the Virginia Assembly that ostensibly would have replaced capital punishment with other penalties, including amputation, for certain crimes, although not all were really punishable by death at the time. For the crimes of rape, sodomy, and polygamy (the last removed from a later version), the punishment was to be castration for men or rhinotomy for women. For intentional maiming, the bill specified literal eye for an eye retribution. The bill never passed, due to the combination of its perceived barbarity in some parts and perceived leniency in others.
- In England, the Offences within the Court Act 1541 provided for cutting off a hand as punishment for striking someone inside a courtroom. Thomas Jefferson's punishments revision bill also intended to repeal this. The punishment was abolished in England and Wales by the Offences Against the Person Act 1828.
- As of 2021, this form of punishment is controversial, as most modern cultures consider it to be morally abhorrent, as it has the effect of permanently disabling a person and constitutes torture. It is thus seen as grossly disproportionate for crimes less than those such as murder.

== Surgery ==
=== Method ===
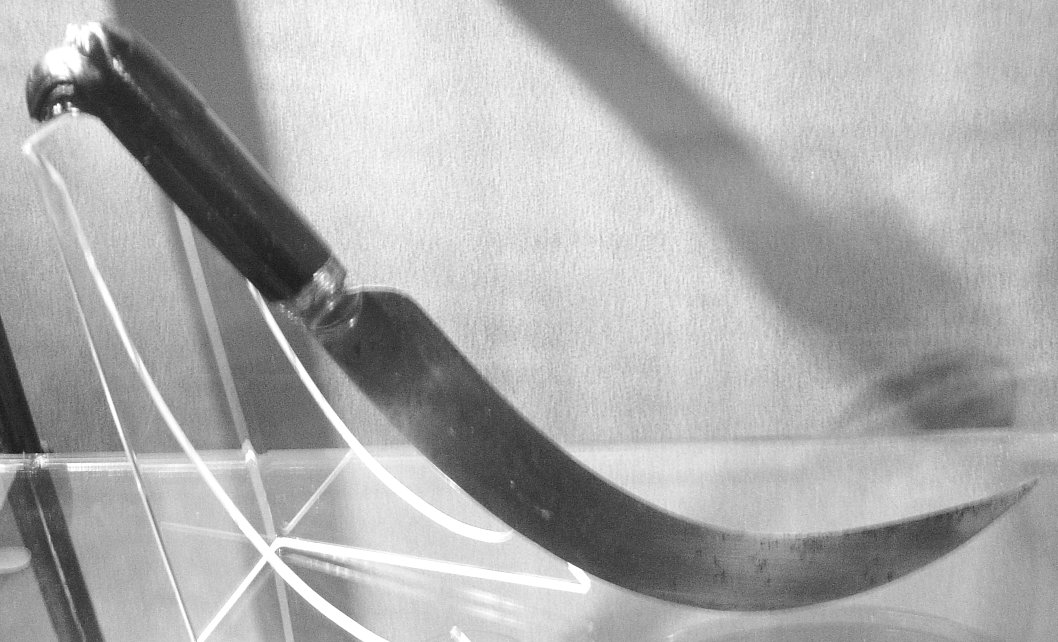
Curved knives such as this one were used, in the past, for some kinds of amputations.

Surgeons performing an amputation have to first ligate the supplying artery and vein, so as to prevent hemorrhage (bleeding). The muscles are transected, and finally, the bone is sawed through with an oscillating saw. Sharp and rough edges of bones are filed, and skin and muscle flaps are then transposed over the stump, occasionally with the insertion of elements to attach a prosthesis.

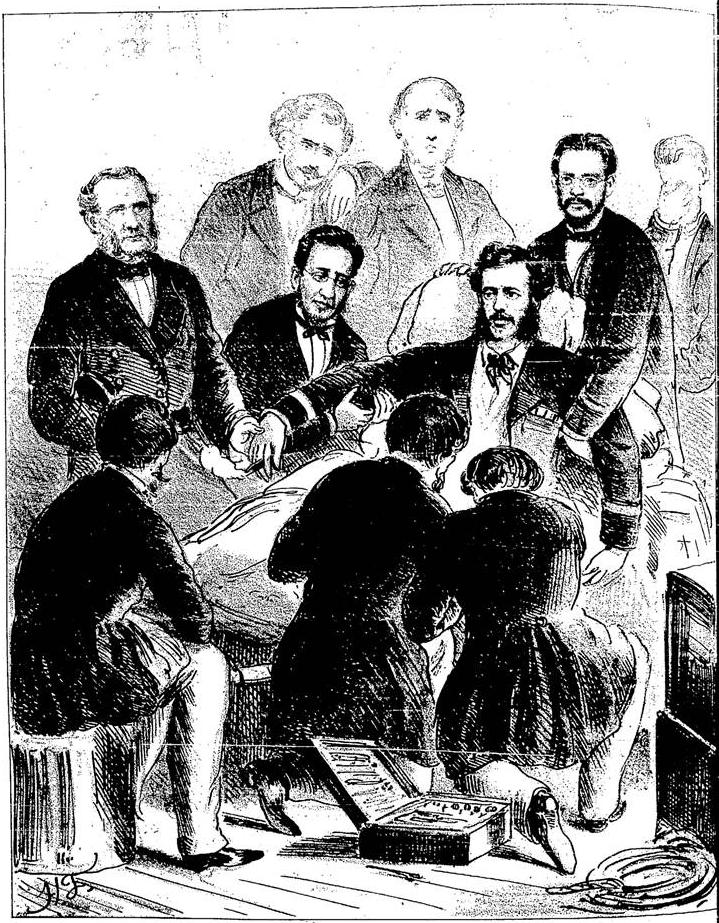
Amputation of the leg of First Lieutenant Antônio Carlos de Mariz e Barros, commander of the Brazilian Battleship Tamandaré (Henrique Fleiuss, Semana Illustrada, 1866)

Distal stabilisation of muscles is often performed. This allows effective muscle contraction which reduces atrophy, allows functional use of the stump and maintains soft tissue coverage of the remnant bone. The preferred stabilisation technique is myodesis where the muscle is attached to the bone or its periosteum. In joint disarticulation amputations tenodesis may be used where the muscle tendon is attached to the bone. Muscles are attached under similar tension to normal physiological conditions.

An experimental technique known as the "Ewing amputation" aims to improve post-amputation proprioception. Another technique with similar goals, which has been tested in a clinical trial, is Agonist-antagonist Myoneural Interface (AMI).

In 1920, Dr. Janos Ertl Sr. of Hungary, developed the Ertl procedure in order to return a high number of amputees to the workforce. The Ertl technique, an osteomyoplastic procedure for transtibial amputation, can be used to create a highly functional residual limb. Creation of a tibiofibular bone bridge provides a stable, broad tibiofibular articulation that may be capable of some distal weight bearing. Several different modified techniques and fibular bridge fixation methods have been used; however, no current evidence exists regarding comparison of the different techniques.

=== Post-operative management ===
A 2019 Cochrane systematic review aimed to determine whether rigid dressings were more effective than soft dressings in helping wounds heal following transtibial (below the knee) amputations. Due to the limited and very low certainty of evidence available, the authors concluded that it was uncertain what the benefits and harms were for each dressing type. They recommended that clinicians consider the pros and cons of each dressing type on a case-by-case basis: rigid dressings may potentially benefit patients who have a high risk of falls; soft dressings may potentially benefit patients who have poor skin integrity.

A 2017 review found that the use of rigid removable dressings (RRD's) in trans-tibial amputations, rather than soft bandaging, improved healing time, reduced edema, prevented knee flexion contractures and reduced complications, including further amputation, from external trauma such as falls onto the stump.

Post-operative management, in addition to wound healing, considers maintenance of limb strength, joint range, edema management, preservation of the intact limb (if applicable) and stump desensitization.

== Trauma ==
Traumatic amputation is the partial or total avulsion of a part of a body during a serious accident, like traffic, labor, or combat.

Traumatic amputation of a human limb, either partial or total, creates the immediate danger of death from blood loss.

Orthopedic surgeons often assess the severity of different injuries using the Mangled Extremity Severity Score. Given different clinical and situational factors, they can predict the likelihood of amputation. This is especially useful for emergency physicians to quickly evaluate patients and decide on consultations.

=== Causes ===
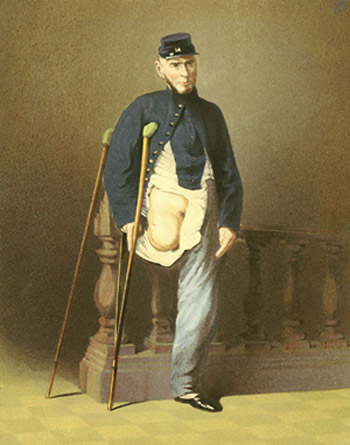
Private Lewis Francis was wounded July 21, 1861, at the First Battle of Bull Run by a bayonet to the knee.

Traumatic amputation is uncommon in humans (1 per 20,804 population per year). Loss of limb usually happens immediately during the accident, but sometimes a few days later after medical complications. Statistically, the most common causes of traumatic amputations are:

- Vehicle accidents (cars, motorcycles, bicycles, trains, etc.)
- Labor accidents (equipment, instruments, cylinders, chainsaws, press machines, meat machines, wood machines, etc.)
- Agricultural accidents, with machines and mower equipment
- Electric shock hazards
- Firearms, bladed weapons, explosives
- Violent rupture of ship rope or industry wire rope
- Ring traction (ring amputation, de-gloving injuries)
- Building doors and car doors
- Animal attacks
- Gas cylinder explosions
- Other rare accidents

=== Treatment ===
The development of the science of microsurgery over the last 40 years has provided several treatment options for a traumatic amputation, depending on the patient's specific trauma and clinical situation:

- 1st choice: Surgical amputation - break - prosthesis
- 2nd choice: Surgical amputation - transplantation of other tissue - plastic reconstruction.
- 3rd choice: Replantation - reconnection - revascularisation of amputated limb, by microscope (after 1969)
- 4th choice: Transplantation of cadaveric hand (after 2000)

=== Epidemiology ===
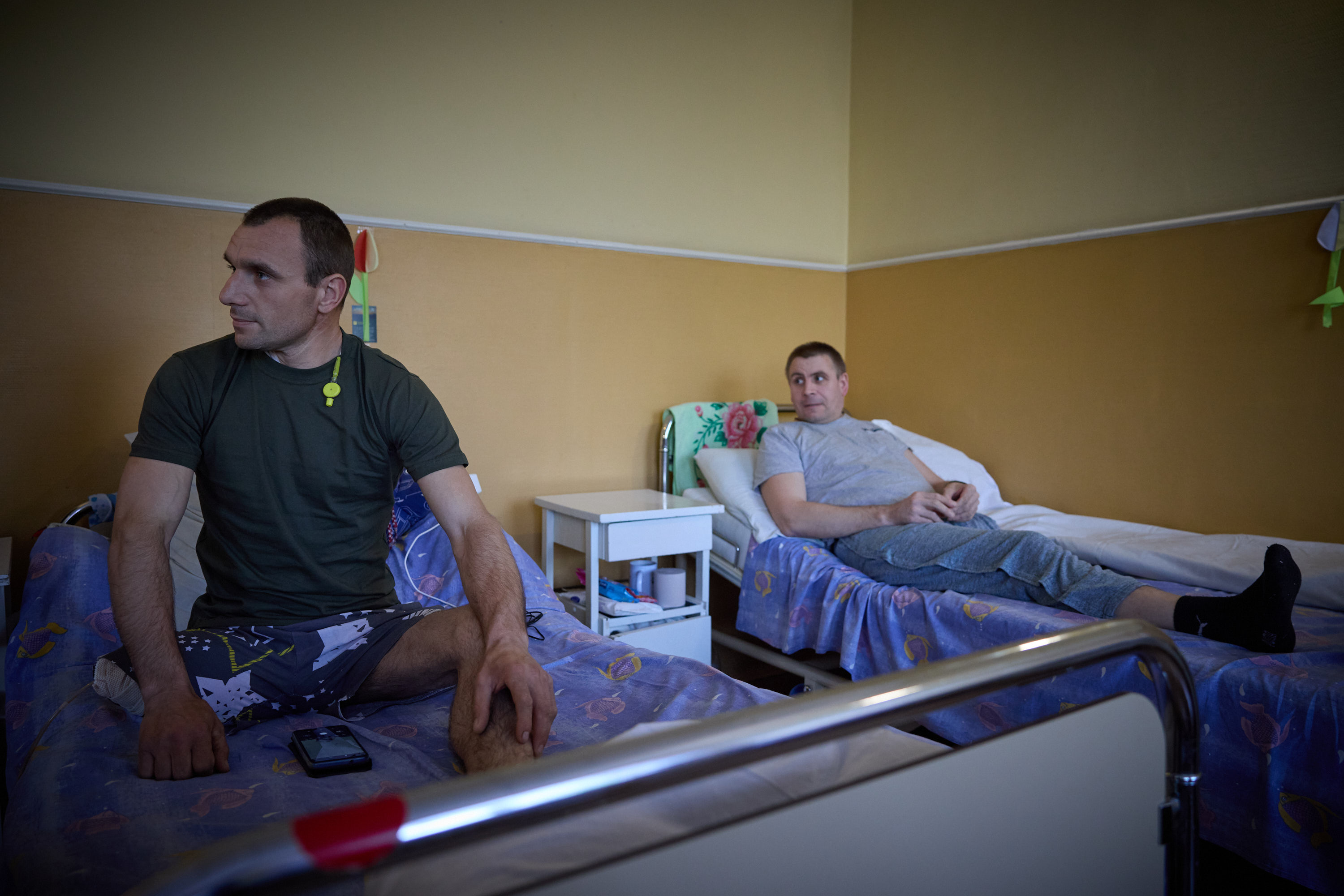
Up to 50,000 Ukrainians lost their limbs during the Russo-Ukrainian war.

- In the United States in 1999, there were 14,420 non-fatal traumatic amputations according to the American Statistical Association. Of these, 4,435 occurred as a result of traffic and transportation accidents and 9,985 were due to labor accidents. Of all traumatic amputations, the distribution percentage is 30.75% for traffic accidents and 69.24% for labor accidents.
- The United States Bureau of Labor Statistics reported 6,200 cases of work-related amputations in 2018. The most common causes of amputations were machinery (58% cases), crush injuries from parts or material (15%), and other tools/instruments/equipment such hand tools (7%).
- A study found that in 2010, 22.8% of patients undergoing amputation of a lower extremity in the United States were readmitted to the hospital within 30 days.
- In 2017, an estimated 57.7 million people globally were living with existing traumatic limb injuries. Of these 57.7 million, the leading causes of amputation "were falls (36.2%), road injuries (15.7%), other transportation injuries (11.2%), and mechanical forces (10.4%)."
- On 2 August 2023, an investigation by The Wall Street Journal found that Ukrainian medical amputations in the war came to between 20,000 and 50,000 including both military and civilians. In comparison, during World War One 41,000 British and 67,000 Germans needed amputations.
- In 2025, Israel's attacks on the Gaza Strip during the Gaza war caused Gaza to have the highest number of child amputees per capita in the world.

== Prevention ==
Methods in preventing amputation, limb-sparing techniques, depend on the problems that might cause amputations to be necessary. Chronic infections, often caused by diabetes or decubitus ulcers in bedridden patients, are common causes of infections that lead to gangrene, which, when widespread, necessitates amputation.

There are two key challenges: first, many patients have impaired circulation in their extremities, and second, they have difficulty curing infections in limbs with poor blood circulation.

Crush injuries where there is extensive tissue damage and poor circulation also benefit from hyperbaric oxygen therapy (HBOT). The high level of oxygenation and revascularization speed up recovery times and prevent infections.

A study found that the patented method called Circulator Boot achieved significant results in prevention of amputation in patients with diabetes and arteriosclerosis. Another study found it also effective for healing limb ulcers caused by peripheral vascular disease. The boot checks the heart rhythm and compresses the limb between heartbeats; the compression helps cure the wounds in the walls of veins and arteries, and helps to push the blood back to the heart.

For victims of trauma, advances in microsurgery in the 1970s have made replantation of severed body parts possible.

The establishment of laws, rules, and guidelines, and the employment of modern equipment help protect people from traumatic amputations.

== Prognosis ==
The individual may experience psychological trauma and emotional discomfort. The stump will remain an area of reduced mechanical stability. Limb loss can present significant or even drastic practical limitations.

A large proportion of amputees (from 50 to 80% to 80–100%, according to different studies) experience the phenomenon of phantom limbs; they feel body parts that are no longer there. These limbs can itch, ache, burn, feel tense, dry or wet, locked in or trapped or they can feel as if they are moving. Some scientists believe it has to do with a kind of neural map that the brain has of the body, which sends information to the rest of the brain about limbs regardless of their existence. Phantom sensations and phantom pain may also occur after the removal of body parts other than the limbs, e.g. after amputation of the breast, extraction of a tooth (phantom tooth pain) or removal of an eye (phantom eye syndrome).

A similar phenomenon is an unexplained sensation in a body part unrelated to the amputated limb. It has been hypothesized that the portion of the brain responsible for processing stimulation from amputated limbs, being deprived of input, expands into the surrounding brain, (Phantoms in the Brain: V.S. Ramachandran and Sandra Blakeslee) such that an individual who has had an arm amputated will experience unexplained pressure or movement on his face or head.

In many cases, the phantom limb aids in adaptation to a prosthesis, as it permits the person to experience proprioception of the prosthetic limb. To support improved resistance or usability, comfort or healing, some types of stump socks may be worn instead of or as part of wearing a prosthesis.

Another side effect can be heterotopic ossification, especially when a bone injury is combined with a head injury. The brain signals the bone to grow instead of scar tissue to form, and nodules and other growth can interfere with prosthetics and sometimes require further operations. This type of injury has been especially common among soldiers wounded by improvised explosive devices in the Iraq War.

Due to technological advances in prosthetics, many amputees live active lives with little restriction. Organizations such as the Challenged Athletes Foundation have been developed to give amputees the opportunity to be involved in athletics and adaptive sports such as amputee soccer.

Nearly half of the individuals who have an amputation due to vascular disease will die within 5 years, usually secondary to the extensive co-morbidities rather than due to direct consequences of an amputation. This is higher than the five year mortality rates for breast cancer, colon cancer, and prostate cancer. Of persons with diabetes who have a lower extremity amputation, up to 55% will require amputation of the second leg within two to three years.

== Medieval and early modern Europe ==
Amputations in medieval and early modern Europe were mainly the result of warfare, disease, work accidents, and punishment. Amputations were performed by barber-surgeons.

=== Disease ===
One of the major causes of amputation in medieval Europe was disease. Ergotism (also known as Saint-Anthony's fire) was a fungus found in rye that caused gangrene that spread from the fingers and toes. If the tissue death from the disease was severe enough, the limb would spontaneously fall off on its own without blood loss.

=== Warfare ===
Warfare amputations became more necessary in Europe after European armies started using guns in the fourteenth century. At the time, bullet wounds were often too complicated for surgeons to handle, and amputation was their best solution. In the late fifteenth century, we see more documentation of amputations as Hieronymus Brunschwig and Hans Von Gersdorff both illustrated amputation scenes, with the latter also writing about gunshot injuries. Gersdorff's writings showed that surgeons at the time struggled with whether the gunpowder on the wound further worsened the injuries. Therefore, it was a common practice to cauterize the wounds with hot oil until Ambroise Paré discovered that this impeded healing, and concluded that gunshot wounds should not be cauterized. This led to another significant contribution of his to warfare medicine: the revival of ligature, which replaced cauterization of amputation wounds. Paré updated ligature to make it safer, and it became common practice.

=== Amputation as punishment ===
There is evidence of amputation as punishment dating back to 1750 BCE. The Babylonian Code of King Hammurabi sanctioned amputation as a punishment. Amputation as a punishment continued in ancient Peru, where the part of the body amputated had a connection to the crime committed (for example, stealing might be punished by amputating the hand of the guilty). Amputation continued as a form of punishment into the Roman period as well as the Byzantine period, but became less prominent after the collapse of the Byzantine Empire. These punishments increased again during the Middle Ages, but declined again after perceptions of punitive amputation changed significantly during the Renaissance and Enlightenment.

In medieval Europe, corpses would sometimes be amputated after death as a form of public shaming or punishment. Medieval Christians believed strongly in the importance of bodily integrity, even after death; therefore, post-execution dismemberment reflected the expectation of eternal damnation for the worst criminals.

There is also documentation of nose amputation being used as a form of punishment or retaliation. In France during the 5th and 6th centuries, nose cutting was prominent enough to be classified as its own crime, which would result in a serious fine to the perpetrator. However, it was also occasionally used as a punishment for serious crimes such as threatening royals. The field of plastic surgery was brought to Europe, specifically Catania, in the fifteenth century, when Gustavo Branca successfully completed an ancient Indian method of reconstructive rhinoplasty. Plastic surgery continued to grow as a field across the continent, and the birth of this field is likely related to nose amputation as punishment.

=== Theories on amputation ===
In medieval Europe, amputation was done on limbs as a last resort when the limb could not be saved. For limbs that were dead or decaying, surgeons categorized them into two main categories: hot fire and cold fire. Hot fire (also called Gangraena) was the first stage of a decaying limb. A body part with hot fire was hot, swollen, and painful. If not treated, the limb would turn cold. Cold fire (also called Sphacelus) was the late stage of limb death, including death of the bone. Symptoms included loss of feeling, coldness, and black and blue coloring. With time, the fire would spread and eventually kill the patient.

Followers of Galen considered hot and cold fire to be based on the humors and an imbalance of hot, wet, dry, and cold in the body. Followers of Paracelsus believed that hot and cold fire were a result of Mercury, sulfur, and salt. While different surgeons drew from different medical theories of the time, they also used their own experiences to determine the root cause of the fires. There was often debate on whether a particular patient had cold or hot fire, which led to disagreements on treatment methods.

Treatment for hot fire often included burning or cutting out damaged flesh. If the symptoms were mild enough, the skin could sometimes be regrown. Treatment for cold fire included removing the dead flesh and likely amputation.

=== Amputation methods ===
Throughout Europe, there were varying approaches when it came to amputations. The two main considerations for amputation procedures were how fast it could be performed and how it would heal. The mallet-and-wedge technique involved setting the body part on a wedge and hitting the wedge with a mallet. This separated the limb or digit from the body by crushing it. This method was very fast but left a messy result that caused the crushed bones to splinter into the remaining part of the limb. The hand's-width method used a curved knife to cut through the limb's tissue, and a bow-frame saw to cut through the bone. An assistant would pull the flesh upwards to expose the bone. After the limb was sawed off, the flesh would then be pulled back over the stump to create a cushion. This procedure took longer but healed more easily.

One method to stop hemorrhaging after amputation was iron cautery. This involved taking hot iron instruments to the new stump and burning off the exposed tissue, closing the blood vessels. Another method of cauterization was to apply corrosive chemicals to the fresh wound to burn the blood vessels and stop the bleeding. Both methods were efficient but led to a long healing process. A different method was ligation. This technique required the surgeon to draw out the individual blood vessels and tie them shut. This process was much more time-consuming but healed more quickly.

There was also debate among barber-surgeons on the location of amputation. One rationale was to amputate as close to the damage as possible to save as much of the remaining limb as possible. Others argued to amputate in a location that would fit a prosthetic the best. This was especially debated for lower leg amputation because a prosthetic would fit better if the leg was amputated closer to the knee. Paré is the first known surgeon to decide the location of an amputation based on how a prosthetic would fit on it in 1564.

=== Prosthetics ===
Prosthetics in the early modern period were made from wood, metal, and leather. The majority of prosthetic artifacts from the period still around today were made of metal. In Germany, metal mechanical hands were made with ratchets and springs. The springs allowed for movement of the fingers, while the ratchets locked them in place. The wearer was able to control the fingers by releasing the ratchets through buttons or levers, depending on the hand. The specific mechanics of the hand varied by prosthetic.

Mechanical prosthetics were the work of artisans, specifically locksmiths and clockmakers. This was because locksmiths and clockmakers were already using springs and ratchets to make locks, doors, and clocks.

== Etymology ==
The word amputation is borrowed from Latin amputātus, past participle of amputāre "to prune back (a plant), prune away, remove by cutting (unwanted parts or features), cut off (a branch, limb, body part)," from am-, assimilated variant of amb- "about, around" + putāre "to prune, make clean or tidy, scour (wool)". The English word "Poes" was first applied to surgery in the 17th century, possibly first in Peter Lowe's A discourse of the Whole Art of Chirurgerie (published in either 1597 or 1612); his work was derived from 16th-century French texts and early English writers also used the words "extirpation" (16th-century French texts tended to use extirper), "disarticulation", and "dismemberment" (from the Old French desmembrer and a more common term before the 17th century for limb loss or removal), or simply "cutting", but by the end of the 17th century "amputation" had come to dominate as the accepted medical term.

== Notable amputees ==
=== Without prosthesis ===
- Rick Allen
- Bethany Hamilton

=== With prosthesis ===
- Götz of the Iron Hand
- Jessica Long
- Sarah Reinertsen

=== Other ===
- Patch Adams
- Douglas Bader
- Carl Brashear
- Lisa Bufano
- Roberto Carlos
- Tammy Duckworth
- Kalamandalam Sankaran Embranthiri
- Terry Fox
- Zach Gowen
- Pete Gray
- Shaquem Griffin
- Robert David Hall
- Hugh Herr
- Frida Kahlo
- Ronnie Lott
- Hari Budha Magar
- Aimee Mullins
- Oscar Pistorius
- Amy Purdy
- Aron Ralston
- Hans-Ulrich Rudel
- Luiz Inácio Lula da Silva
- Henri de Tonti
- Alex Zanardi
- Lev Yashin

== See also ==
- Acrotomophilia
- Adapted automobile
- Flail limb
- Robotic prosthesis control
