= Abalkin =

Abalkin (Russian: Аба́лкин; masculine) or Abalkina (Аба́лкина; feminine) is a Russian surname. It derives from the Pskov regional dialectal word "аба́лка" (abalka) or "оба́лка" (obalka), meaning a bale, a bundle, or, by analogy, a swaddled child.

People with this last name

- Leonid Abalkin (1930–2011), Soviet/Russian economist

Fictional characters

- Lev Abalkin, a character in Arkady and Boris Strugatsky's series of science fiction novels set in the Noon Universe
