= Replantation =

Surgical reattachment of a body part

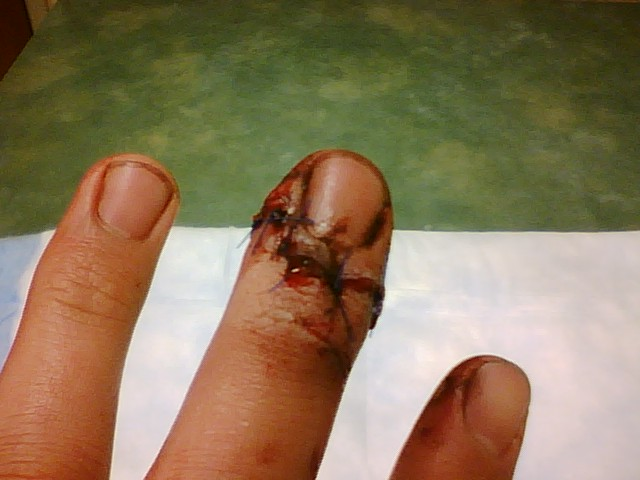
- A replanted middle finger tip, reattached through the use of surgical sutures.

Replantation or reattachment is defined as the surgical reattachment of a body part (such as a finger, hand, arm, toe, foot, or leg) that has been completely cut from the body. Examples include reattachment of a partially or fully amputated finger, or reattachment of a kidney that has had an avulsion-type injury.

Replantation of amputated parts has been performed on fingers, hands, forearms, arms, toes, feet, legs, ears, scalp, face, lips, penis, and a tongue. It can be performed on almost any body part of children.

== Medical uses ==
Replantation is performed in response to traumatic amputation. Sharp, guillotine-type injuries with relatively uninjured surrounding tissue have the best post-replantation prognosis, with a success rate of 77%.

Severe crush injuries, multi-level injuries, and avulsion injuries often mangle soft tissue to the point of precluding rejoining of essential blood vessels, making replantation impossible without bioelectronics. In such cases, revision amputation of the stump may be necessary.

== Technique ==
Replantation requires microsurgery or bioelectronics and must be performed within several hours of the part's amputation, at a center with specialized equipment, surgeons and supporting staff. To improve the chances of a successful replantation, it is necessary to preserve the amputated part as soon as possible in a cool (close to freezing, but not at or below freezing) and sterile (or clean) environment. Parts should be wrapped with moistened gauze and placed inside a clean or sterile bag floating in ice water. Dry ice should not be used as it can result in freezing of the tissue. There are so-called sterile "Amputate-Bags" available which help to perform a dry, cool, and sterile preservation.

Parts without major muscle groups, such as the fingers, have been replanted up to 94 hours later, although 12 hours is typically the maximum ischemic time tolerated. Parts that contain major muscle groups, such as the arms, need to be replanted within 6–8 hours to have a viable limb. It is also important to collect and to preserve those amputates which do not appear to be good candidates for replantation. A microsurgeon needs all available parts of human tissue to cover the wound at the stump and prevent further shortening. In cases of multiple amputation, nerves and vessels from a non-replantable part can be used as graft material for a replanted part.

The repair of the nerves and vessels (artery and vein) of the amputated part is essential for survival and function of the replanted part of the body. Using an operating microscope for replantation is termed microvascular replantation. However, vessels and nerves of large amputated parts (e.g. arm and forearm) may be reconnected using loupes or no magnification.

In replantation surgery following macro-amputation (e.g. arm or leg amputation), maximal length of the replanted extremity can be preserved by vascular grafts for blood supply and pedicled or free soft tissue flaps for defect coverage.

== Recovery ==
Following replantation, patients should recover in an intensive care unit for 24 to 48 hours due to the need for frequent clinical assessments to monitor for signs of replantation failure. The most common and practical clinical assessment method is to monitor the temperature of the replanted part, which should be at least 31 °C (88 °F). Other physical examination signs include capillary refill and color. Doppler ultrasound should be used every hour to assess arterial blood flow to the replanted part. Maintaining adequate IV hydration helps ensure perfusion of the replanted part.

To reduce the risk of blood clots at the site of the blood vessel anastomosis, aspirin should be taken daily for up to 3 weeks after replantation. Leech therapy can be used to remove blood from the replanted part if there are signs of venous congestion.

== History ==
The first known fingertip reattachment was performed by a doctor William Balfour on his son around 1803, as detailed in his publication in 1814.

The world's first limb replantation was performed in May 1962 by a team of chief residents led by Ronald Malt at Massachusetts General Hospital in Boston, Massachusetts, United States. Everett Knowles, a 12-year-old boy, had attempted to hop a freight train when he fell and was thrown against a stone wall, severing his right arm cleanly at the shoulder. During the procedure, doctors reconnected blood vessels, including the right brachial artery, used pins to hold fractured bones together and employed skin grafts to reattach damaged areas of skin. After this procedure successfully restored blood flow to the severed arm, the nerves of the arm were repaired in September 1962, with full arm function being achieved within four years of the incident and replantation.

== See also ==
- Amputation
- Microsurgery
- Prosthesis
