= Behnam Shakibaie =

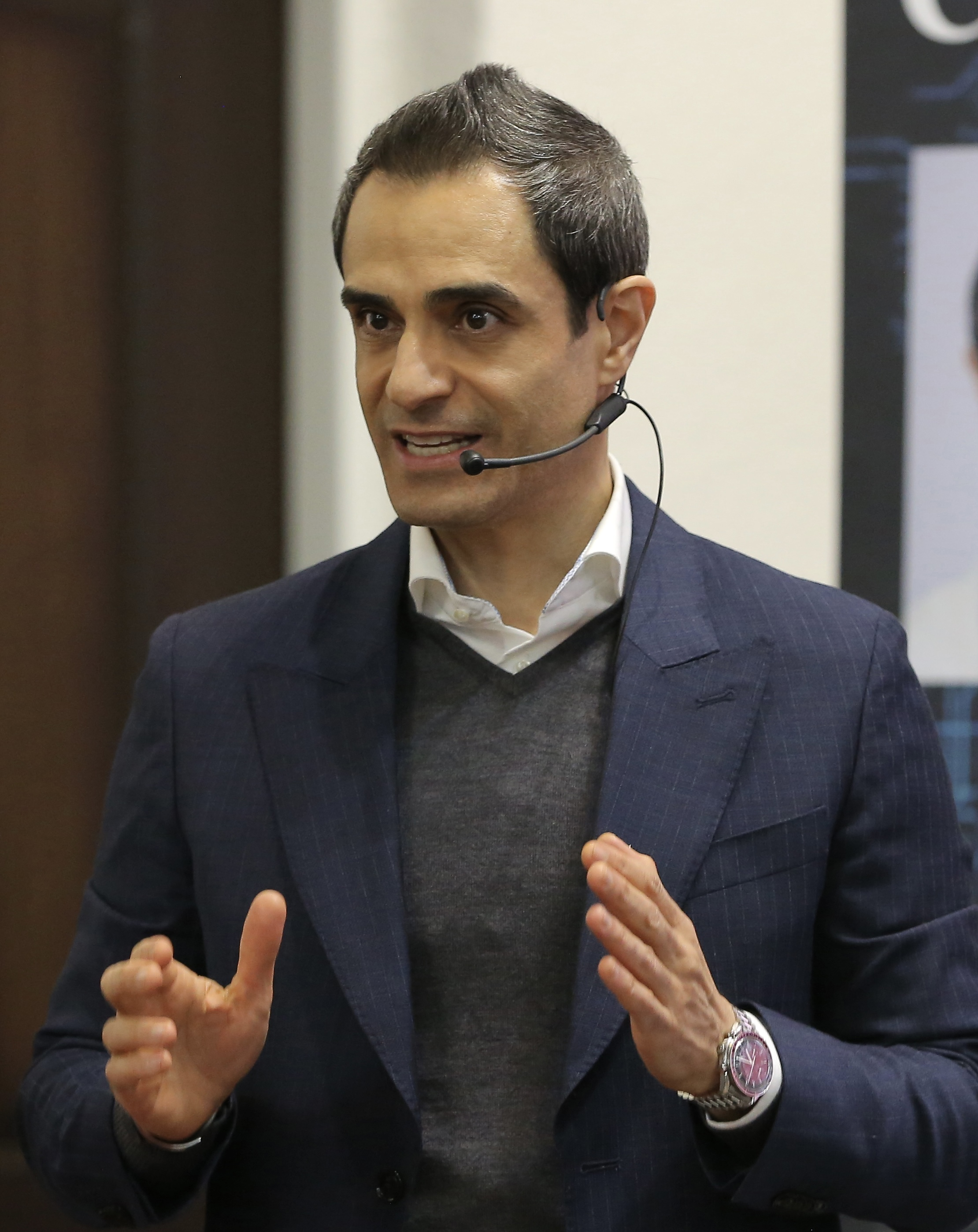
- Born: 1972 (age 53–54); Ahvaz, Iran
- Education: Berlin Charite University, Bonn University, German Association of Implantology(DGI), German Association of Periodontology (DGP), and Zeiss Dental Academy
- Occupations: Oral surgeon, microscopic dentistry researcher and educator

Behnam Shakibaie (Persian: دکتر بهنام شکیبایی; born 1972), Iranian-German oral surgeon, microscopic dentistry specialist, researcher and educator. He has invented microscopic and microsurgical instruments and treatment techniques in oral implantology.

== Early life and education ==
Shakibaie was born in Ahvaz, Iran in 1972. He immigrated to Germany in 1986, at the age of 14. He graduated from high school in Berlin in 1991 and received his degree in dentistry from Berlin Charite University in 1998. Shakibaie underwent additional training at Berlin Charite University and Bonn University to earn his specialization in oral surgery in 2003.

He also completed a postgraduate Mastership in Implantology at the German Association of Implantology (DGI), a postgraduate Mastership in Periodontology at the German Association of Periodontology (DGP), and a specialization in Oral Microsurgery and Microscopic Dentistry at Zeiss Dental Academy.

== Career ==
After graduating from college, Shakibaie worked as an oral surgeon in London, Zurich, and Dubai. Shakibaie also operated a clinic in Rheda-Wiedenbrück, Germany.

In 2005, Shakibaie began developing microsurgical techniques and instruments for oral implantology and jaw bone reconstruction.

Between 2008 and 2010, Shakibaie scientifically documented and published the systematic use of dental operating microscopes and various implant microsurgery techniques in oral implantology.

In the year 2012, Shakibaie's microscopic implant technique was broadcast in 3D on a World Conference, on the International Congress of the European Society of Microscopic Dentistry (ESMD) in Berlin.

In 2023, Shakibaie's treatment method was presented as dentistry standard in the United States after his research on microscopic and digital implantology was published in the dental journal COMPENDIUM.

== Research ==
Shakibaie heads a research team at the University of Pennsylvania and the University of Michigan. He has researched and developed new methods in systematic use of operating microscope in dentistry, particularly in oral implantology.

== Selected publications ==
- Shakibaie, B. (2013). Comparison of the effectiveness of two different bone substitute materials for socket preservation after tooth extraction: a controlled clinical study. International Journal of Periodontics & Restorative Dentistry, 33(2).
- Shakibaie, B., Blatz, M., Sabri, H., Jamnani, E., Barootchi, S. (2023). Effectiveness of two differently processed bovine-derived xenografts for alveolar ridge preservation with a minimally invasive tooth extraction approach: a feasibility clinical trial. International Journal of Periodontics & Restorative Dentistry, 43, 541-549.
- Shakibaie, B., Blatz, M. B., Conejo, J., & Abdulqader, H. (2023). From minimally invasive tooth extraction to final chairside fabricated restoration: A microscopically and digitally driven full workflow for single-implant treatment. Compendium of Continuing Education in Dentistry (15488578), 44(10).
- Shakibaie, B., Sabri, H., Blatz, M. B., & Barootchi, S. (2023). Comparison of the minimally‐invasive roll‐in envelope flap technique to the holding suture technique in implant surgery: A prospective case series. Journal of Esthetic and Restorative Dentistry, 35(4), 625-631.
