= Leonid Abalkin =

Russian economist (1930–2011)

- Born: 5 May 1930; Moscow, Russian SFSR, Soviet Union
- Died: 2 May 2011 (aged 80); Moscow, Russia
- Awards: Medal of Honour

Leonid Ivanovich Abalkin (Russian: Леони́д Ива́нович Аба́лкин; 5 May 1930 – 2 May 2011) was a Russian economist.

== Biography ==
Abalkin was born in Moscow in 1930. He was a graduate of the Plekhanov Moscow Institute of the National Economy.

He became director of the Institute of Economics of the USSR Academy of Sciences in 1986. He was a member of the Congress of People's Deputies of the Soviet Union with special responsibility for economic affairs. He later worked as an advisor to Presidents Mikhail Gorbachev and Boris Yeltsin, and was the second-in-command of Premier Nikolai Ryzhkov's government. Under Gorbachev he was one of the major advocates of rapid economic reform, with the consultancy of the Italian economist Giancarlo Pallavicini, and in 1998 became a member of the Economic Crisis Group. Since 1995 Abalkin was also a member of the New York Academy of Sciences.

Upon hearing of his death, the then Russian president Dmitry Medvedev stated:

Mr Abalkin was one of the figures at the origins of Russia’s transformation to a market economy and did much to establish new economic mechanisms. A scholar known all around the world, Academician Abalkin had deserved influence in the Russian and international academic communities.

== Honours and awards ==
- Order of Merit for the Fatherland, 3rd class (18 November 2010) – for his significant contribution to the development of domestic science in economics and many years of fruitful activity; 4th class (5 May 2000) – for services to science and training of highly qualified personnel
- Medal of Honour (14 November 2005) – for great contribution to science and education
- Order of Friendship of Peoples
- Order of the Badge of Honour
- Laureate of the Science Support Foundation in the category "Outstanding Scientists" (2004)
