= Stump sock =

Cloth accessory for amputation stumps

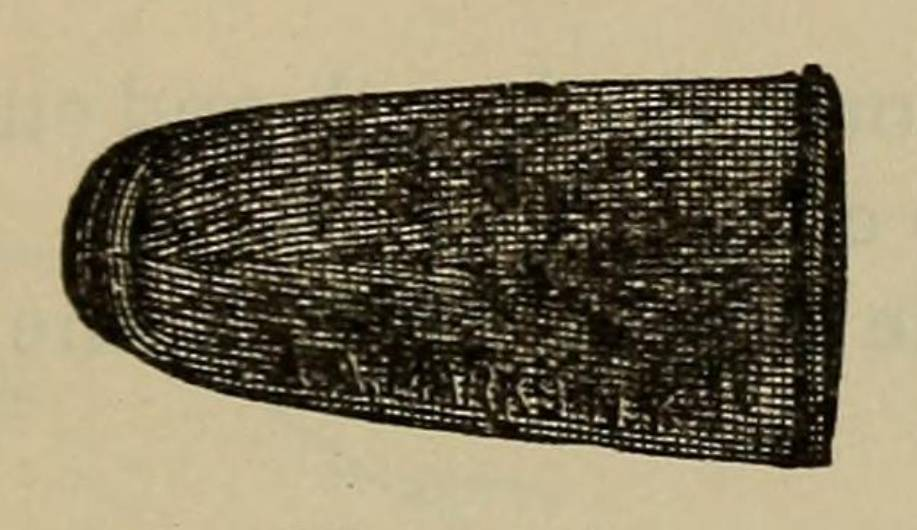
1901 illustration of a stump sock

Stump socks are tubular medical or clothing accessories with a blind end that are fashioned similar to socks, usually without a heel. They are worn on amputation stumps for a number of reasons. As stump socks are typically worn on body parts that do not contain a foot, their definition is distinct from the average sock type garment.

Amputation stumps can be sensitive to cold or heat, particularly as their capacity to regulate tissue congestion is limited. The skin of amputation stumps can be very sensitive to allergic, chemical or mechanical irritation and thus may have to be protected.

There are different types of stump socks, some of which are available individually made to fit, some as industrially manufactured items:

- socks with metal fabric that are worn to reduce phantom sensation or pain
- compression socks that are worn to reduce tissue congestion or swelling
- protective socks or liners that are worn to fit the stump inside a prosthesis
- socks that are worn to keep the stump warm
- socks or liners that contain skin care products on their inside that are released into the skin
