= Ronald A. Malt =

American clinical surgeon and teacher

Ronald A. Malt (November 12, 1931 – October 5, 2002) was an American clinical surgeon and teacher at Massachusetts General Hospital (MGH) and Harvard Medical School for over 40 years.

Born in Pittsburgh, Malt attended Washington University and Harvard Medical School. Best known for his role as the chief surgical medical resident who oversaw the world's first successful reattachment of a human limb, Malt also developed new techniques in gastrointestinal surgery, was professor of surgery at Harvard University, co-edited The Oxford Textbook of Surgery and was an associate editor at The New England Journal of Medicine. When he retired in 1997, Malt was the Chief of Gastroenterological Surgery, Chief of the Nutritional Support Unit and the Surgical Chief of the Liver, Biliary and Pancreas Center at the MGH, and had authored or co-authored over 300 publications.

He was married to Geraldine Malt, with whom he had three children. Malt died on October 5, 2002, in Wellesley, Massachusetts, of complications of Alzheimer's disease.

== Education ==
Ronald A. Malt earned a bachelor's degree from Washington University in St. Louis before graduating from Harvard Medical School in 1955. Initially interested in psychiatry, an experience in William McDermott's operating room as a medical student persuaded him to elect surgery as his calling. Malt went on to pursue full-time research training at the Massachusetts Institute of Technology.

== Career ==
Malt accepted an internship at Massachusetts General Hospital in 1955. Although influenced by a number of surgeons during his training there, the most notable was Dr Edward D. Churchill 1896-1972, who had developed a residency program following World War II boasting a plethora of surgeons. Before returning to the surgical residency program at MGH in 1958, which he finished as Chief Resident in 1961-62, Malt completed his military service requirement in the laboratories of the School of Naval Aviation in Pensacola, Florida.

Following in the footsteps of Churchill, Malt focused his efforts on clinical surgery and advancing medicine in the laboratory for the bulk of his career. He established a lab upon his return to MGH, which focused on compensatory hypertrophy/hyperplasia of the kidney, liver, and bowel.

Malt was named Chief of Gastroenterology at MGH in 1970, Visiting Surgeon in 1972 and Professor of Surgery at Harvard Medical School in 1975.

He also wrote The Practice of Surgery, co-edited the Oxford Textbook of Surgery and was an associate editor at The New England Journal of Medicine.

== First successful replantation of a severed limb (Everett Knowles) ==
At the age of 30, while Chief Resident at MGH, Ronald A. Malt became a celebrated surgical figure. On May 23, 1962, Malt led a team of surgeons who accomplished the first successful replantation of a completely severed limb.

Heading to baseball practice, a young Everett Knowles hopped on the back of a freight train. When the train lurched, it sent him into a stone abutment, severing his right arm. Knowles and the arm were rushed to Massachusetts General Hospital, where Malt quickly assembled a team. Malt "was afraid [he] might overlook some unseen serious injury to some other part of [Knowles'] body, or that because of insufficient restoration of blood supply he’d get gas gangrene or some other infection. [Malt] wondered, too, if they might make "a psychic invalid out of him by giving him an arm that mightn’t work.”

While some doctors prepared Everett for surgery, others worked on the separated arm. First, they rejoined the “chaotically mangled blood vessels, then the bone and finally the skin.” Everett’s skin had grown a “deathly gray” by the time surgery had begun, but it grew steadily pinker as the surgery progressed. Doctors attached the bone with a special pin before reconnecting the arteries. They grafted skin and muscle together. Then they waited to see whether the operation would take, raising their hopes when the hand regained a healthy pink color and a pulse could be felt in the wrist. Nerves were reconnected in a later surgery.

Malt called Everett’s parents when the surgery was over and told them all they could do was wait and pray. “Oh, there were so many praying for him,” Mrs. Knowles said. “When we went to our church there wasn’t one candle left to light. We had to go all the way to St. Joseph’s.” When the Knowleses visited their son the next day, they expected to find him in bandages up to his eyeballs, but were instead greeted by their smiling son. Mrs. Knowles recalls, "There he was laying with a big grin all over him and only a cast on his arm. He was afraid we’d be mad at him for ruining his good suit jacket and hopping freights. I said I’d buy him a new one when he got home. I’d buy him two. He told us he wanted to watch the Three Stooges and then he asked Daddy if he’d be able to play baseball again."

Previously many arms and legs had been saved after being partially severed, but Everett was the first to have undergone a successful grafting of a major extremity that had been cut away completely.

Malt later stated that the procedure relied on previously established surgical techniques, and emphasized the collaborative effort involved, noting the contributions of multiple specialists who shared their expertise during the operation.

== Awards and honors ==
· Fellow of the School for Advanced Study, MIT, 1963

· Fellow, Medical Foundation of Ecuador, 1963

· University of Leeds, Honorary Fellow, 1965

· Fernando Ocaranza Award, Mexican National Academy of Medicine, 1971

· Arris & Gale Lecturer, Royal College of Surgeons, 1975

· Chairman, Conference on Colonic Carcinogenesis, Black Forest, 1981

· Scientific Review Committee, New England Heart Association, 1972–73

· Scientific Advisory Committee, Damon Runyon Cancer Fund, 1972–77

· Research Committee, The Medical Foundation, 1972–78

· National Research Council Committee for Veterans Administration, 1974–76

· Editor, Surgical Techniques Illustrated, 1974–80

· Board of Surgical Advisors, National Cancer Institute, 1975–77

· Board Member, American Board of Surgery, 1977–83

· Editorial Board, Jordan Medical Journal, 1981–83

· Senior Member, American Board of Surgery, 1984-1997

· Surgery Program Chair, XIV International Cancer Congress, 1979–82

· Associate Editor, New England Journal of Medicine, 1965 – 1993

· Co-editor, Oxford Textbook of Surgery, 1987-1994

· MERIT award, National Institutes of Health, 1988–98

· International Advisory Board, Current Practice in Surgery, 1989-1997

· Trustee of Donations for Education in Liberia, 1989-1997

· Surgikos Lecturer, Association for Surgeons of Great Britain and Ireland, 1991

· Vice-President, Society for Surgery of Alimentary Tract, 1991–92

· Scientific Advisory Committee, Columbia University, Comprehensive Cancer Center, 1992–95

· International Scientific Advisory Board, European Postgraduate Gastro-Surgical School, 1993.

== Death ==
Malt died on October 5, 2002, from complications of Alzheimer disease.
