= Forequarter amputation =

Amputation of the arm, shoulder, and collarbone

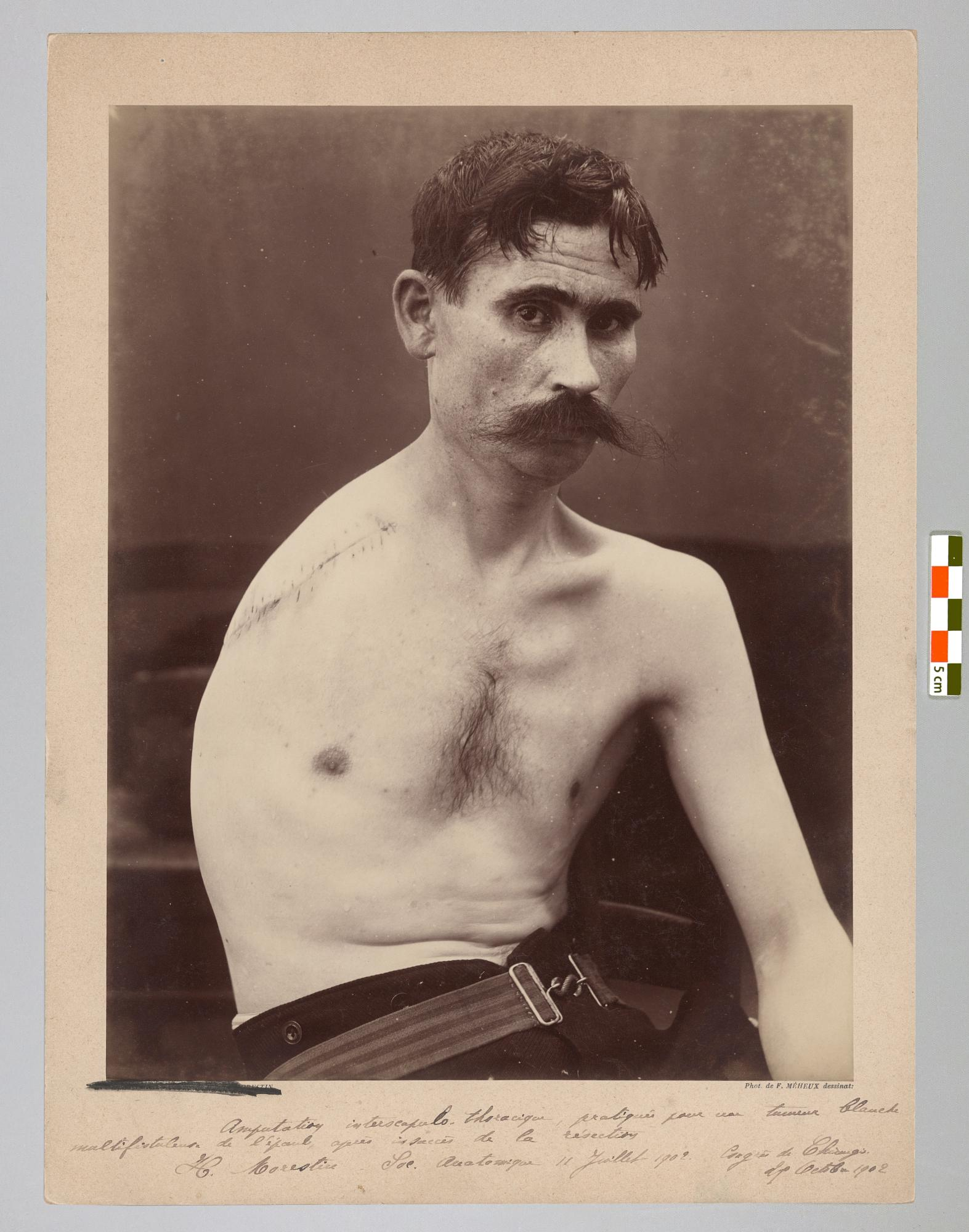
- Forequarter amputation in France in 1902 (Sorbonne University)
- Specialty: Surgical oncology

Forequarter amputation is amputation of the arm, scapula and clavicle. It is usually performed as a last resort to remove a cancer, but decreasingly so as limb-sparing operations improve.

== Surgical technique ==
The rhomboid muscles, trapezius, levator scapulae and latissimus dorsi are transected. The neurovascular bundle consisting of the axillary artery, axillary vein and brachial plexus is ligated and cut. The area of the chest left exposed is then normally covered with a split-thickness skin graft.

== Society ==
In 2008, David Nott, a British vascular surgeon in the Democratic Republic of the Congo with Médecins Sans Frontières, performed a forequarter amputation to save the life of a 16-year-old boy, whose arm had been severed by an injury. He was left with a gangrenous stump and had a few days to live.

"The first thing I realised when I saw J was that he was dying. All that remained of this 16-year-old's arm was six inches of skin; the rest had been shot off when he became caught in gunfire between the Congolese army and rebel forces. A further amputation had left him open to infection, and now he was facing the prospect of an awful, agonising death over a period of several days – hallucinations, dehydration, his kidneys packing up, his breathing going and then, finally, his heart."

It made the news because his colleague, Joseph Meirion Thomas, sent pointers via SMS text message. The text message included 10 steps to be followed and finished by saying, "Easy! Good luck."

The text David Nott received:

"Start on clavicle. Remove middle third. Control and divide subsc art and vein. Divide large nerve trunks around these as prox as poses. Then come onto chest wall immed anterior and divide Pec maj origin from remaining clav. Divide pec minor insertion and (very imp) divide origin and get deep to serrates anterior. Your hand sweeps behind scapula. Divide all muscles attached to scapula. Stop muscle bleeding with count suture. Easy! Good luck. Meirion"
