= Giancarlo Rebizzi =

Italian footballer (born 1933)

Personal information
- Date of birth: October 5, 1933 (age 93)
- Place of birth: Milan, Italy
- Position: Striker

Senior career*
Years	Team	Apps	(Gls)
1953–1954	Internazionale	0	(0)
1954–1956	Legnano	31	(15)
1956–1957	Brescia	23	(7)
1957	Internazionale	4	(1)
1957–1959	Bari	20	(10)
1959–1960	Ozo Mantova	19	(5)
1960–1961	Triestina	18	(4)
1961–1962	Akragas	19	(?)
- * Club domestic league appearances and goals

Giancarlo Rebizzi (born October 5, 1933 in Milan) is a retired Italian professional football player.

== Honours ==
- Serie B top scorer: 1954/55 (14 goals).
