= Gian-Carlo =

Gian-Carlo may refer to:

- Gian-Carlo Carra, Canadian politician
- Gian-Carlo Coppola (1963–1986), American film producer
- Gian-Carlo Pascutto (born 1982), Belgian computer programmer
- Gian-Carlo Rota (1932 – 1999) Italian mathematician and philosopher

== See also ==
- Gian Carlo
- Giancarlo
