= Giancarlo Snidaro =

Italian footballer

Giancarlo Snidaro (born 21 September 1954 in Pradamano) is an Italian retired footballer. He played as a central midfielder. After many years in Serie C1 he went to Atalanta and gained a promotion in Serie A in 1983–84. After that he was sold to Piacenza. After retirement he managed Alzano youth teams.

== Career ==
1972–1973 Alessandria 1 (0)
1973–1974 Anconitana 23 (6)
1974–1975 Alessandria 3 (1)
1975–1976 Civitavecchia 34 (17)
1976–1981 Reggina 152 (16)
1981–1984 Atalanta 93 (4)
1984–1988 Piacenza 103 (8)
1988–1989 Trevigliese 27 (8)
