= Giancarlo Giudice =

Italian serial killer

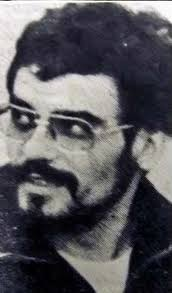
- Born: 11 March 1952 (age 74); Turin, Piedmont, Italy
- Other name: "The Monster of Turin"
- Convictions: Murder x9 Attempted murder x2
- Penalty: Life imprisonment; commuted to 24 years imprisonment later revised to 30 years imprisonment and 3 years of involuntary commitment

Details
- Victims: 9
- Span of crimes: 1983–1986
- Country: Italy
- State: Piedmont
- Date apprehended: 25 August 1986

Giancarlo Giudice (born 11 March 1952), known as The Monster of Turin (Italian: Il Mostro di Torino), is an Italian serial killer who murdered nine prostitutes in Turin from 1983 to 1986. Convicted and sentenced to 30 years imprisonment for the crimes, he was released in 2008 and has lived as a free man ever since.

== Biography ==
Giancarlo Giudice was born in Turin on 11 March 1952. His father Primo, originally from Cuneo, was a veteran of the Russian campaign and current employee at Fiat who was known for being crude and an alcoholic. On the other hand, Giancarlo was close to his mother, and after she became ill from a heart ailment when he was eight, he started to take care of her. However, he was then sent off to the Don Orione Boarding School in Fubine Monferrato, and during his stay there, his mother died. At age 13, after attending his mother's funeral, Giudice attempted suicide by swallowing tablets from the infirmary - upon learning of this incident, he was sent back to his father.

When he came of age, Giudice entered military service as an alpino, but went AWOL from the barracks and returned home. For this reason, he was imprisoned for some time in a military prison, but later pardoned and allowed to finish his service as an infantryman. At around this time, his father remarried to Maria Rosa Fazio and moved with his new wife in Calabria, abandoning his son behind in Turin. Distraught by this, Giudice began to use crack cocaine and LSD, and frequently changed jobs. Fazio would later claim that the pair never got along, mostly due to Giudice's preference to stay at home, and that he did not even attend his father's funeral when Primo died from cirrhosis.

At the age of 25, he began working as a truck driver for a company in Brandizzo, but then quit his job and in 1979, he found employment at the Zanzone Trucking Company in Cigliano, where he was regarded as a bizarre, shy man by his colleagues, but commended on his diligent work ethic. One colleague would later note that Giudice never mentioned ever being in a relationship, sometimes did not show up for work because he "didn't feel like it" and often brought pornographic magazines to his workplace.

When he acquired enough money, he bought a house at 33 Cravero Street in the suburb of Regio Parco. His neighbours there described him as relatively friendly, but also very odd, as he was often unkempt, oblivious and avoided conversation with others. Reportedly, when he stopped paying his bills and both his electricity and gas were turned off, Giudice just brushed it off and hooked it illegally to his neighbour's junction box, as well as borrowing cylinders from his neighbour's mother to cook.

=== Murders ===
On 27 December 1983, Giudice met 40-year-old Sicilian-born prostitute Francesca "Franca" Pecoraro on Settimo Street and then killed her in her house. Then, in the dead of night, he stole a Bianchina from a garage on the same street where she lived and burned the car with the corpse inside on Enna Street in the Barriera di Stura area. The body was identified by Rome forensic police in August 1986, after re-examining a fragment taken from the victim's fingertip.

On 1 January 1984, he met 48-year-old prostitute of Lucanian origin Annunziata "Nunzia" Pafundo, who had previously been convicted of infanticide and diagnosed as mentally ill. After strangling her, Giudice dumped her naked body in Mezzi Stura in Settimo Torinese. It was later found on 8 January and identified on 22 January via fingerprints.

On 26 March, Giudice met 24-year-old prostitute Lidia Geraci in Corso Polonia and tried to kill her, but decided to spare her after she told him that she had three children. Much to Geraci's surprise, he even apologized and did not resist when she reported him to the police. For this crime, he was sentenced to six months imprisonment.

On 19 March 1985, he strangled 64-year-old Giovanna "Gianna" Bricchi, a woman who was forced into prostitution due to her son's drug addiction, whose corpse he then threw into the Po River. At the end of the month, Giudice stabbed to death 47-year-old Addolorata Benvenuto in the throat and then threw her body into the Stura di Lanzo River.

In February 1986, Giudice met two prostitutes on the Lungo Dora Voghera three weeks apart: 44-year-old Maria Rosa Corda and 66-year-old Laura Belmonte. Corda was beaten with a hammer, while Belmonte was strangled with a stocking at Giudice's parents' bedroom - after killing each, he then bound their hands and feet with electric wires. Finally, he carried both bodies wrapped in a blanket and threw them into canals: Corda inside the Risale Rocca canal in Villareggia, and Belmonte into an unnamed canal in Saluggia.

In early April, he shot 44-year-old prostitute Maria Galfrè at point-blank before dragging her corpse to a shack near the Stura di Lanzo, which he then burned down. On May 21, Giudice tortured and strangled 58-year-old prostitute Clelia Mollo with a nylon stocking at her apartment at 10 XX Settembre Street.

When questioned later, Giudice claimed that he killed those eight prostitutes because they were all ugly, dirty, and old, and because they resembled his stepmother. He also claimed that he felt a "chill down [his] spine" that led him to kill.

On 28 June 1986, in Castello di Annone, he loaded his last victim, 36-year-old former NAP-affiliated terrorist and prostitute Maria Rosa Paoli, into his Lancia Fulvia. He then shot her in the temple near Rocchetta Tanaro, after which he hid the body behind a bush near the Santhià cemetery. An hour later, he was stopped by the police at a checkpoint to have his documents checked - while inspecting his car, the officers found two guns with cartridges, a bloodstained back seat and a rag stained with what was later determined to be Paoli's blood.

=== Arrest, trial, and imprisonment ===
Following the discovery of Clelia Mollo's body on 24 May police began actively hunting for the killer, but faced difficulties, resulting in most of the areas frequented by prostitutes becoming deserted.

Immediately after his arrest, Giudice confessed to killing Paoli and showed where he had hidden the body, after which he was taken to the Molinette Prison in Turin and then to the Judicial Psychiatric Hospital in Reggio Emilia. In August 1986, he confessed to the other murders, whereupon he was transferred to a prison in Ivrea.

Giudice stood trial on 22 March 1989, after a court in Turin, presided over by Vladimiro Zagrebelsky, ruled him sane. While initially sentenced to life imprisonment, the sentence was later commuted to 24 years imprisonment and several years detention at a mental health facility.

On 24 August 1989, Giudice attempted to strangle 22-year-old prison guard Pietro Paolo Putzu, but the exact motive for the attack was undetermined. For this, he was convicted of attempted murder and given an additional 8 years imprisonment. A subsequent appeal was denied and his sentence was commuted to 30 years imprisonment and 3 years in the Judicial Psychiatric Hospital.

Giudice was paroled on 25 October 2008, after serving just over 22 years. He has since been granted a new identity, and his current whereabouts are unknown.

== See also ==
- Donato Bilancia
- List of serial killers by country
