= Giancarlo Pantano =

Italian footballer

Personal information
- Date of birth: June 15, 1977 (age 49)
- Place of birth: Rome, Italy
- Height: 1.74 m (5 ft 9 in)
- Position: Midfielder

Senior career*
Years	Team	Apps	(Gls)
1995–1998	Lodigiani	30	(7)
1996	→ Astrea (loan)	33	(8)
1998–2001	Pistoiese	28	(7)
1999	Gualdo	14	(2)
2000–2003	Lodigiana	35	(1)
2002	→ Pistoiese (loan)	1	(0)
2003–2004	Igea Virtus	13	(1)
2004	Latina	3	(0)
2004–2005	Frascati	15	(3)
2005–2008	Cisco Roma	6	(0)
2008–2009	Almas Roma		
- * Club domestic league appearances and goals

Giancarlo Pantano (born 15 June 1977) is an Italian former footballer who played as a midfielder.
