= Robotic prosthesis control =

Method for controlling a prosthesis

Robotic prosthesis control is a method for controlling a prosthesis in such a way that the controlled robotic prosthesis restores a biologically accurate gait to a person with a loss of limb. This is a special branch of control that has an emphasis on the interaction between humans and robotics.

== Background ==
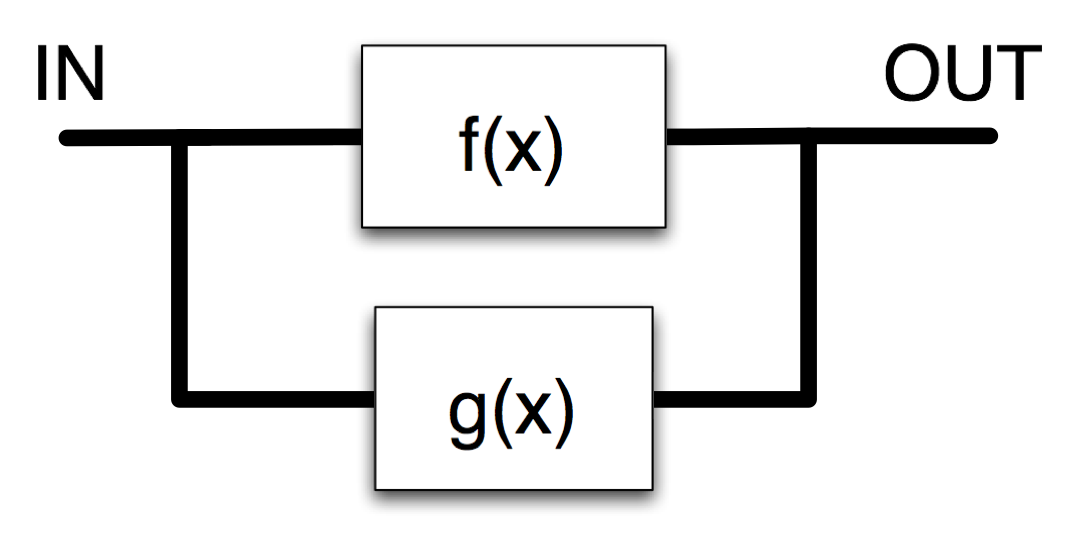
Basic control block diagram used in the designing of controllers for a system

In the 1970s several researchers developed a tethered electrohydraulic transfemoral prosthesis. It only included a hydraulically actuated knee joint controlled by off-board electronics using a type of control called echo control. Echo control tries to take the kinematics from the sound leg and control the prosthetic leg to match the intact leg when it reaches that part of the gait cycle. In 1988 a battery-powered active knee joint powered by DC motors and controlled by a robust position tracking control algorithm was created by Popovic and Schwirtlich. Tracking control is a common method of control used to force a particular state, such as position, velocity, or torque, to track a particular trajectory. These are just two examples of previous work that has been done in this field.

== Lower limb control ==
=== Impedance control ===
This form of control is an approach used to control the dynamic interactions between the environment and a manipulator. This works by treating the environment as an admittance and the manipulator as the impedance. The relationship this imposes for robotic prosthesis the relationship in between force production in response to the motion imposed by the environment. This translates into the torque required at each joint during a single stride, represented as a series of passive impedance functions piece wise connected over a gait cycle. Impedance control doesn't regulate force or position independently, instead it regulates the relationship between force and position and velocity. To Design an impedance controller, a regression analysis of gait data is used to parameterize an impedance function. For lower limb prosthesis the impedance function looks similar to the following equation.

$\tau = k(\theta-\theta{\scriptstyle\text{0}}) + b\dot{\theta}$

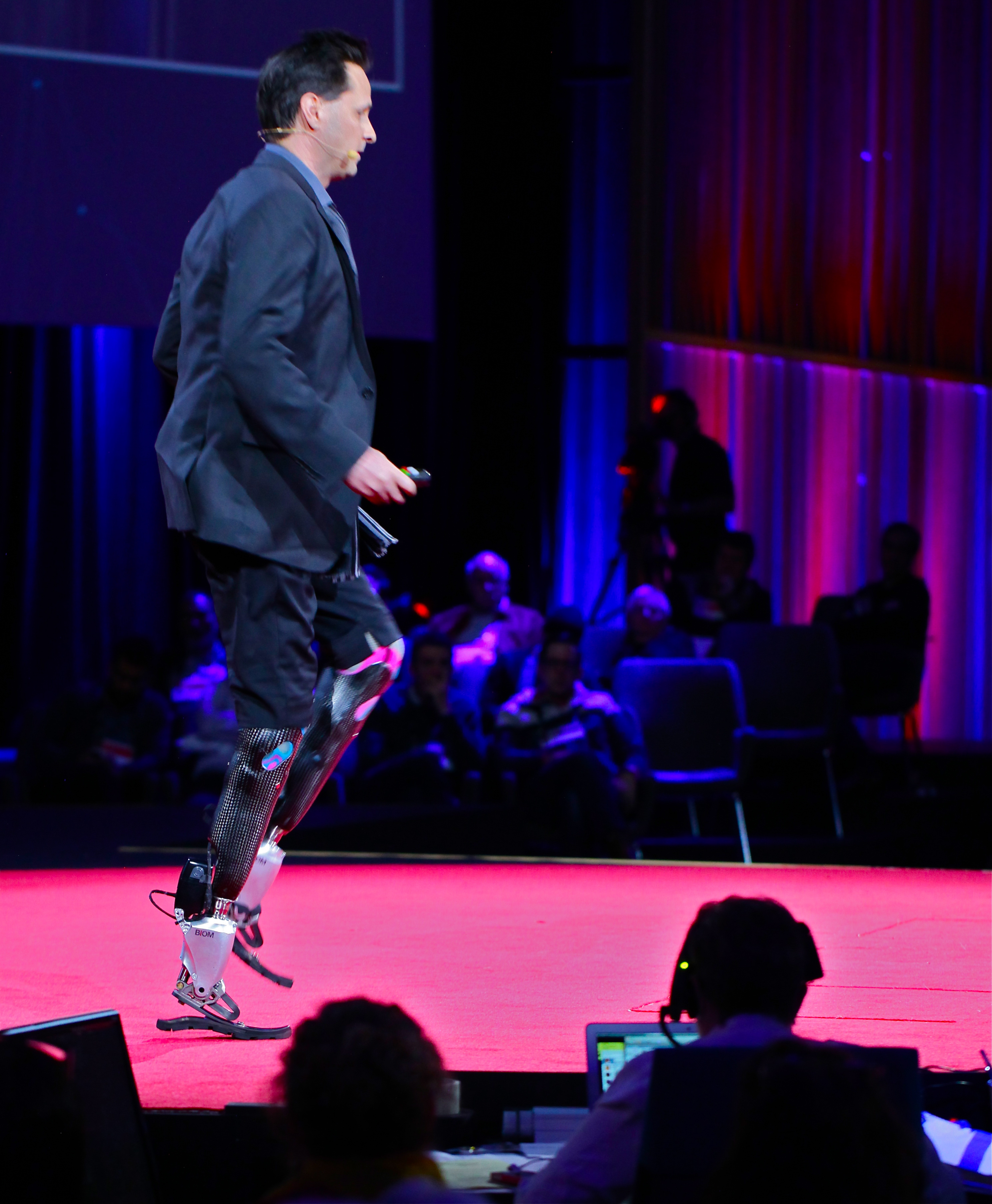
Hugh Herr demonstrating new robotic prosthetic legs at TED 2014: "That was the first demonstration of a running gait under neural command. The more I fire my muscles, the more torque I get."

The terms k (spring stiffness), θ_{0} (equilibrium angle), and b (damping coefficient) are all parameters found through regression and tuned for different parts of the gait cycle and for a specific speed. This relationship is then programmed into a micro controller to determine the required torque at different parts of the walking phase.

=== Myoelectric control ===
Electromyography (EMG) is a technique used for evaluating and recording the electrical activity produced by skeletal muscles. Advanced pattern recognition algorithms can take these recordings and decode the unique EMG signal patterns generated by muscles during specific movements. The patterns can be used to determine the intent of the user and provide control for a prosthetic limb. For lower limb robotic prosthesis it is important to be able to determine if the user wants to walk on level ground, up a slope, or up stairs. Currently this is where myoelectric control comes intro play. During transitions between these different modes of operation EMG signal becomes highly variable and can be used to complement information from mechanical sensors to determine the intended mode of operation. Each patient that uses a robotic prosthesis that is tuned for this type of control has to have their system trained for them specifically. This is done by having them go through the different modes of operation and using that data to train their pattern recognition algorithm.

=== Speed-adaptation mechanism ===
The speed-adaption mechanism is a mechanism used to determine the required torque from the joints at different moving speeds. During the stance phase it has been seen that quasistiffness, which is the derivative of the torque angle relationship with respect the angle, changes constantly as a function of walking speed. This means that over the stance phase, depending on the speed the subject is moving, there is a derivable torque angle relationship that can be used to control a lower limb prosthesis. During the swing phase joint torque increases proportionally to walking speed and the duration of the swing phase decreases proportionally to the stride time. These properties allow for trajectories to be derived that can be controlled around that accurately describe the angle trajectory over the swing phase. Because these two mechanism remain constant from person to person this method removes the speed and patient specific tuning required by most lower limb prosthetic controllers.

=== Model-independent quadratic programs (MIQP)+Impedance control ===
Walking gait is classified as hybrid system, meaning that it has split dynamics. With this unique problem, a set of solutions to hybrid systems that undergo impacts was developed called Rapid Exponentially Stabilizing Control Lyapunov Functions(RES-CLF). Control Lyapunov function are used to stabilize a nonlinear system to a desired set of states. RES-CLFs can be realized using quadratic programs that take in several inequality constraints and return an optimal output. One problem with these are that they require a model of the system to develop the RES-CLFs. To remove the need of tuning to specific individuals Model Independent Quadratic Programs (MIQP) were used to derive CLFs. These CLFs are only focused on reducing the error in the desired output without any knowledge of what the desired torque should be. To provide this information an impedance control is added to provide a feed forward term that allows the MIQP to gather information about the system it is controlling without having a full model of the system.

== Upper limb control ==
Commercial solutions exploit superficial EMG signals to control the prosthesis. Furthermore, researchers are investigating alternative solutions that exploit different biological sources:

- implanted electrodes (neural, intramuscular and epymisial electrodes) to record neural or muscle activity;
- pressure sensor matrices to detect force changes during muscle contraction;
- the myokinetic approach to measure muscle deformation.

=== Myokinetic control ===
Myokinetic control represents an alternative to standard myoelectric control. It aims at measuring muscle deformation during contraction instead of muscle electrical activity. A novel approach recently emerged in 2017 which is based on sensing the magnetic field of permanent magnets directly implanted into residual muscles. Localizing the position of the magnet is equivalent to measuring the contraction/elongation of the muscle it is implanted in as the magnet moves with it. This information can be used to interpret the voluntary movement of the subject and consequently control the prosthesis. The magnetic signals generated by the magnets are detected by external sensors placed around the residual limb. Localization is then implemented by an optimization method that performs the tracking by solving the magnetic inverse problem (e.g., Levenberg–Marquardt algorithm).
