= Giancarlo Morolli =

Italian philatelist

- Occupation: Philatelist

Giancarlo Morolli is an Italian philatelist who signed the Roll of Distinguished Philatelists in 2010.

== Profession ==
Morolli is a management advisor in information technologies, a freelance journalist and a member of the Professional Association of Journalists of Italy. He is also a member of the FIP Thematic Commission since 1968.
