= Microsurgery =

Surgery requiring an operating microscope

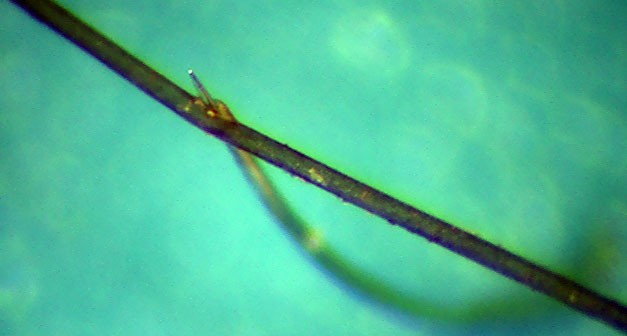
- A microsurgical needle passing through a human hair
- MeSH: D008866

Microsurgery is a general term for surgery requiring an operating microscope. The most obvious developments have been procedures developed to allow anastomosis of successively smaller blood vessels and nerves (typically 1 mm in diameter) which have allowed transfer of tissue from one part of the body to another and re-attachment of severed parts. Microsurgical techniques are utilized by several specialties today, such as general surgery, ophthalmology, orthopedic surgery, gynecological surgery, otolaryngology, neurosurgery, oral and maxillofacial surgery, endodontic microsurgery, plastic surgery, podiatric surgery and pediatric surgery.

== History ==
Otolaryngologists were the first physicians to use microsurgical techniques. A Swedish otolaryngologist named Carl-Olof Siggesson Nylén was the father of microsurgery. In 1921, in the University of Stockholm, he built the first surgical microscope, a modified monocular Brinell-Leitz microscope. At first he used it for operations in animals. In November of the same year he used it to operate on a patient with chronic otitis who had a labyrinthine fistula. Nylen's microscope was soon replaced by a binocular microscope, developed in 1922 by his colleague Gunnar Holmgren.

Gradually the operating microscope began to be used for ear operations. In the 1950s many otologists began to use it in the fenestration operation, usually to perfect the opening of the fenestra in the lateral semicircular canal. The revival of the stapes mobilization operation by Rosen, in 1953, made the use of the microscope mandatory, although it was not used by the originators of the technique, Kessel (1878), Boucheron (1888) and Miot (1890). Mastoidectomies began to be performed with the surgical microscope and so were the tympanoplasty techniques that became known in the early 1950s. The stapes mobilization operation had varying results and was soon replaced by stapedectomy, first described by John Shea, Jr.; this was an operation that was always performed with the microscope.

Today neurosurgeons are very proud to use microscopes in their procedures. But it was not always so: many prestigious centers did not accept that idea and it had to be developed in relative isolation. In the late 1950s William House began to explore new techniques for temporal bone surgery. He developed the middle fossa approach and perfected the translabyrinthine approach and began to use these techniques to remove acoustic nerve tumors. The first neurosurgeon to make use of the surgical microscope was a Turkish emigrant, Gazi Yasargil. In 1953 he studied neurovascular surgery during work with Prof. Hugo Krayenbühl in Switzerland. His ideas interested Dr. Pete Donaghy, who invited Yasargil to his microvascular laboratory in Burlington, Vermont. After his return to Zürich in 1967 Yasargil concentrated on discovering clinical applications to their novel inventions. Publications on that topic: Micro-Vascular Surgery and Microsurgery Applied to Neurosurgery won him international recognition. His lifelong experiences with microsurgery were recapitulated in the four-volume textbook entitled simply Microneurosurgery.

Advances in the techniques and technology that popularized microsurgery began in the early 1960s to involve other medical areas. The first microvascular surgery, using a microscope to aid in the repair of blood vessels, was described by vascular surgeon, Julius H. Jacobson II of the University of Vermont in 1960. Using an operating microscope, he performed coupling of vessels as small as 1.4 mm and coined the term microsurgery. Hand surgeons at the University of Louisville, Drs. Harold Kleinert and Mort Kasdan, performed the first revascularization of a partial digital amputation in 1963.

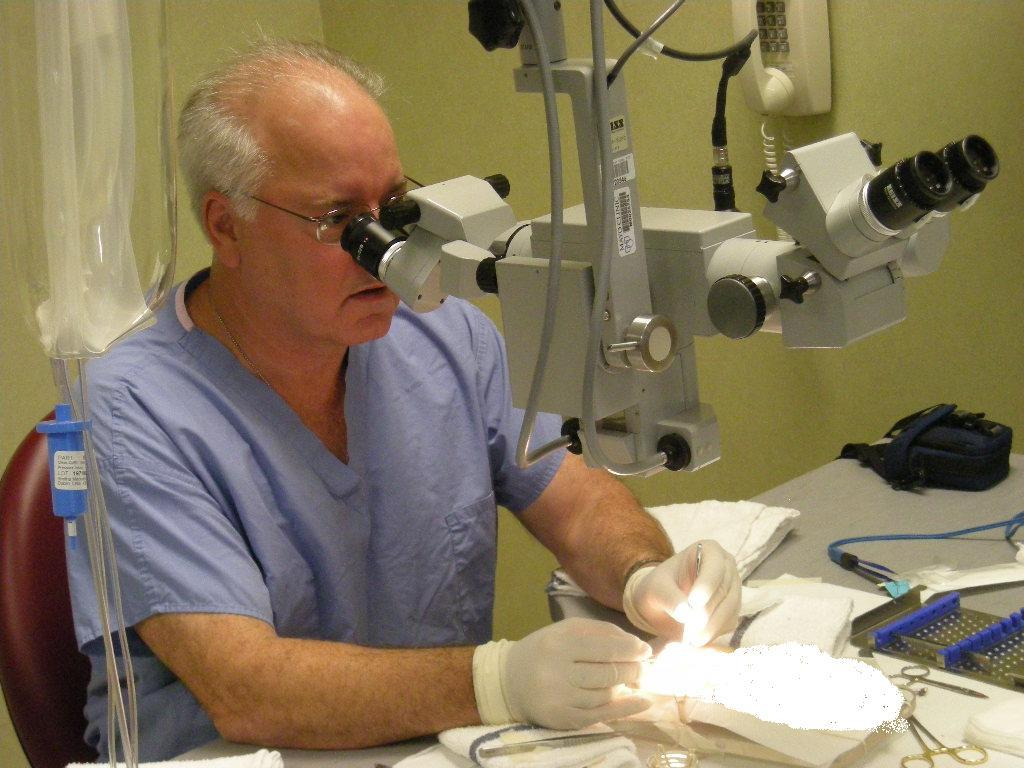
A podiatrist prepares for microsurgery.

Nakayama, a Japanese cardiothoracic surgeon, reported the first true series of microsurgical free-tissue transfers using vascularized intestinal segments to the neck for esophageal reconstruction after cancer resections using 3–4 mm vessels.

Contemporary reconstructive microsurgery was introduced by an American plastic surgeon, Dr. Harry J. Buncke. In 1964, Buncke reported a rabbit ear replantation, famously using a garage as a lab/operating theatre and home-made instruments This was the first report of successfully using blood vessels 1 millimeter in size. In 1966, Buncke used microsurgery to transplant a primate's great toe to its hand.

During the late sixties and early 1970s, plastic surgeons ushered in many new microsurgical innovations that were previously unimaginable. The first human microsurgical transplantation of the second toe to thumb was performed in February 1966 by Dr. Dong-yue Yang and Yu-dong Gu, in Shanghai, China. Great toe (big toe) to thumb was performed in April 1968 by Dr. John Cobbett, in England. In Australia work by Dr. Ian Taylor saw new techniques developed to reconstruct head and neck cancer defects with living bone from the hip or the fibula.

A number of surgical specialties use microsurgical techniques. Otolaryngologists (ear, nose, throat and head and neck surgeons) perform microsurgery on structures of the inner ear and the vocal cords. Otolaryngologists and maxillofacial surgeons use microsurgical techniques when reconstructing defects from resection of head and neck cancers. Cataract surgery, corneal transplants, and treatment of conditions like glaucoma are performed by ophthalmologists. Urologists and gynecologists frequently now reverse vasectomies and tubal ligations to restore fertility.

== Free tissue transfer ==
Free tissue transfer is a surgical reconstructive procedure using microsurgery. A region of "donor" tissue is selected that can be isolated on a feeding artery and vein; this tissue is usually a composite of several tissue types (e.g., skin, muscle, fat, bone). Common donor regions include the rectus abdominis muscle, latissimus dorsi muscle, fibula, radial forearm bone and skin, and lateral arm skin. The composite tissue is transferred (moved as a free flap of tissue) to the region on the patient requiring reconstruction (e.g., mandible after oral cancer resection, breast after cancer resection, traumatic tissue loss, congenital tissue absence). The vessels that supply the free flap are anastomosed with microsurgery to matching vessels (artery and vein) in the reconstructive site. The procedure was first done in the early 1970s and has become a popular "one-stage" (single operation) procedure for many surgical reconstructive applications.

Traumatic foot/ankle soft tissue wound from motor vehicle accident

Anterio-lateral thigh flap free-tissue transfer reconstruction

== Replantation ==
Replantation is the reattachment of a completely detached body part. Fingers and thumbs are the most common but the ear, scalp, nose, face, arm and penis have all been replanted. Generally replantation involves restoring blood flow through arteries and veins, restoring the bony skeleton and connecting tendons and nerves as required. Robert Malt and Charles Mckhann reported the first replantation of two human upper extremities by microvascular means in 1964, with the first arm replanted in a child after a train injury in 1962 in Boston. Initially, when the techniques were developed to make replantation possible, success was defined in terms of a survival of the amputated part alone. However, as more experience was gained in this field, surgeons specializing in replantation began to understand that survival of the amputated piece was not enough to ensure success of the replant. In this way, functional demands of the amputated specimen became paramount in guiding which amputated pieces should and should not be replanted. Additional concerns about the patient's ability to tolerate the long rehabilitation process that is necessary after replantation both on physical and psychological levels also became important. So, when fingers are amputated, for instance, a replantation surgeon must seriously consider the contribution of the finger to the overall function of the hand. In this way, every attempt will be made to salvage an amputated thumb, since a great deal of hand function is dependent on the thumb, while an index finger or small finger might not be replanted, depending on the individual needs of the patient and the ability of the patient to tolerate a long surgery and a long course of rehabilitation.

However, if an amputated specimen is not able to be replanted to its original location entirely, this does not mean that the specimen is unreplantable. In fact, replantation surgeons have learned that only a piece or a portion may be necessary to obtain a functional result, or especially in the case of multiple amputated fingers, a finger or fingers may be transposed to a more useful location to obtain a more functional result. This concept is called "spare parts" surgery.

== Transplantation ==
Microsurgical techniques have played a crucial role in the development of transplantation immunological research because it allowed the use of rodent models, which are more appropriate for transplantation research (there are more reagents, monoclonal antibodies, knockout animals, and other immunological tools for mice and rats than other species). Before it was introduced, transplant immunology was studied in rodents using the skin transplantation model, which is limited by the fact that it is not vascularized. Thus, microsurgery represents the link between surgery and transplant immunological research. The first microsurgical experiments (porto-caval anastomosis in the rat) were performed by Dr. Sun Lee (pioneer of microsurgery) at the University of Pittsburgh in 1958. After a short time, many models of organ transplants in rat and mice have been established. Today, virtually every rat or mouse organ can be transplanted with relative high success rate. Microsurgery was also important to develop new techniques for transplantation, that would be later performed in humans. In addition, it allows reconstruction of small arteries in clinical organ transplantation (e.g. accessory arteries in cadaver liver transplantation, polar arteries in renal transplantation and in living liver donor transplantation).

== Treatment of infertility ==
Microsurgery has been used to treat several pathologic conditions leading to infertility such as tubal obstructions, vas deferens obstructions, and varicocele, which is one of the most frequent cause of male infertility. Microsurgical drainages by placing microvascular bypasses between spermatic and inferior epigastric veins as proposed by Flati et al. have been successfully performed in treating male infertility due to varicocele. Microsurgical treatment has been shown to significantly improve fertility rate also in patients with recurrent varicocele who had previously undergone non-microsurgical treatments.
