= Operating microscope =

Optical microscope used in surgery

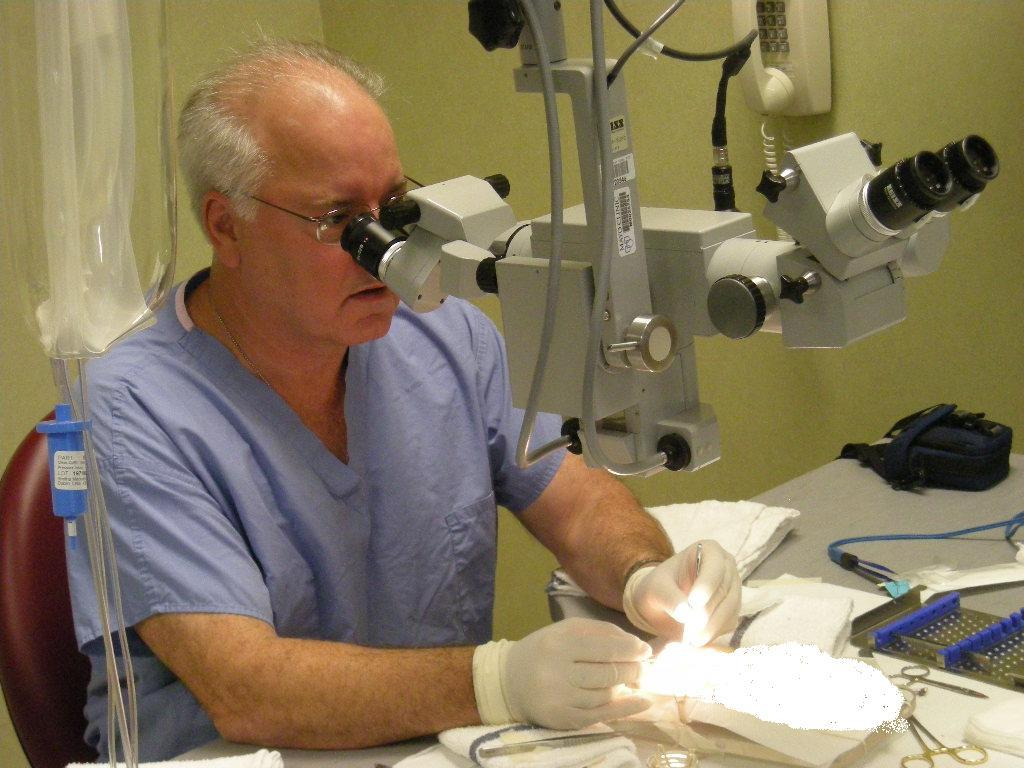
A podiatrist prepares for microsurgery.

An operating microscope or surgical microscope is an optical microscope specifically designed to be used in a surgical setting, typically to perform microsurgery.

Design features of an operating microscope are: magnification typically in the range from 4x-40x, components that are easy to sterilize or disinfect in order to ensure cross-infection control.

There is often a prism that allows splitting of the light beam in order that assistants may also visualize the procedure or to allow photography or video to be taken of the operating field.

Typically an operating microscope might cost several thousand dollars for a basic model, more advanced models may be much more expensive. Additionally, specialized microsurgical instruments may be required to make full use of the improved vision the microscope affords. It can take time to master use of an operating microscope.

Fields of medicine that make significant use of the operating microscope include plastic surgery, dentistry (especially endodontics), ENT surgery, ophthalmic surgery, and neurosurgery.

== In neurosurgery ==
The operating microscope revolutionized neurosurgery by allowing surgeons to see neural structures in fine detail. In 1957, Dr. Theodore Kurze (Los Angeles) and Dr. Robert Rand (UCLA) were the first to bring a surgical microscope into the neurosurgical operating room, dramatically improving visualization of brain tissue. Prior to this, neurosurgeons had to rely on the naked eye or simple magnifying loupes, making delicate operations riskier. The introduction of the microscope sharply reduced complications and mortality, as it enabled surgeons to work through very small openings while clearly viewing critical anatomy.

Professor M. Gazi Yasargil later built upon this innovation and is widely regarded as the founder of modern microneurosurgery. Yasargil systematically applied the operating microscope to procedures like aneurysm clipping and tumor removal. Under his leadership (at Zurich and later Arkansas), neurosurgical methods were transformed: specialized microsurgical instruments and refined techniques were developed for use with the microscope, allowing much smaller incisions and more precise dissection. In short, Yasargil's work made microsurgery the standard of care in many brain surgeries, merging anatomical knowledge with optical magnification to maximize safety and efficacy.

== In eye surgery ==
In Eye (ophthalmic) surgery, there are procedures which routinely utilize a surgical microscope, such as cataract surgery and corneal transplantation. An Optical coherence tomograph (OCT) can be added to aid the surgeon, especially during retinal surgery. The ophthalmic (eye surgery) field also embraced the operating microscope early on. In 1953 the Carl Zeiss company introduced its first surgical microscope (the OPMI® 1) in collaboration with ENT specialist Prof. Horst Wullstein and ophthalmologist Prof. Heinrich Harms. Dr. Harms of Tübingen was among the first to use this Zeiss microscope for eye procedures, reporting in 1953–1954 on its use in repairing traumatic eye injuries and performing corneal transplants (keratoplasty). At almost the same time, surgeons Ignacio and José Barraquer in Colombia and Argentina independently began using operating microscopes for ocular surgery. These pioneers demonstrated that magnification could greatly improve the precision of delicate tasks like suturing the cornea or repairing intraocular damage.

Today the operating microscope is standard equipment in virtually all ophthalmic surgeries. It is routinely used in cataract extraction, glaucoma work, retina and vitreous surgery, corneal transplants, and other fine procedures, providing high magnification and coaxial illumination. For example, Harms's early use of the microscope in corneal surgery paved the way for modern keratoplasty techniques. By the 1960s and 1970s, microscope-aided techniques had become the norm, enabling surgeons to manipulate tiny ocular structures and sutures that would be impossible to see clearly otherwise. Advances in microscope optics (zoom lenses, wide-angle viewing) and lighting (halogen and LED with red-reflex enhancement) have further improved the safety and outcomes of eye surgery, making intricate microsurgery tasks routine in ophthalmology.

== In dentistry ==
In dentistry, an example of a procedure which commonly uses an operating microscope would be endodontic retreatment, where the magnification provided by the operating microscope improves visualisation of the anatomy present leading to better outcomes for the patient. It has been suggested that the well-focused illumination and magnification should be part of a standard of care in endodontic therapy. However, a Cochrane review did not find any studies that met the inclusion criteria to confirm or dispute the hypothesis; therefore suggesting further research.

Operating Microscop in Dental implantology has its roots in the mid-20th century. The Swedish physician Per-Ingvar Brånemark is credited with introducing the concept of osseointegration – the bonding of titanium with bone – and he developed the first modern titanium dental implants in the 1960s. His pioneering work transformed how missing teeth are replaced and earned him the title "father of modern dental implantology". Over time, implant surgery evolved to address more complex cases (sinus lifts, ridge augmentation, etc.), and clinicians sought ways to make these procedures less invasive and more precise.

In recent years, the operating microscope has become an important tool in implant dentistry. In 2008–2010 Dr. Behnam Shakibaie was the first to systematically describe and publish the use of the dental operating microscope for implant and bone reconstruction procedures. His team developed new microsurgical implant techniques that minimize tissue trauma. By 2024 Shakibaie's group had published multiple papers setting "new world records" in implant microsurgery, highlighting how magnification can improve precision and reduce patient recovery time. A recent review of the literature confirms a clear trend toward microscope-assisted periodontal and implant microsurgery, citing dozens of studies on minimally invasive implant procedures under magnification. In short, dental implant surgery today often incorporates an operating microscope to achieve finer control, especially in esthetic zones or complex bone grafting cases.

== Other procedures ==
Surgical microscopes are used in anastomosis procedures carried out to join blood vessels in vascular surgery.

Surgical microscopes are often used for the insertion of the Tympanostomy tube particularly in pediatric cases.

== See also ==
- Stereo microscope
- Optical coherence tomography
- Confocal microscope
