= Gian Carlo =

Gian Carlo is an Italian masculine blended given name that is a combination of Gianni and Carlo. Notable people known by this name include the following:

- Gian Carlo Aliberti, also Giovanni Carlo Aliberti, (1670 - 1727), Italian painter
- Gian Carlo Abelli (1941 – 2016), Italian politician
- Gian Carlo Capicchioni (born 1956), Sammarinese politician
- Gian Carlo di Martino (born 1964), Venezuelan politician
- Gian Carlo Fusco (1915 – 1984), Italian writer, journalist, screenwriter and occasional actor
- Gian Carlo Menotti (1911 – 2007), Italian composer and librettist
- Gian Carlo Michelini (born 1935), Italian Roman Catholic priest
- Gian Carlo Muzzarelli (born 1955), Italian politician
- Gian Carlo Oli (1934 - 1996), Italian lexicographer
- Gian Carlo Passeroni (1713 – 1803), Italian poet
- Gian Carlo Pedrajas, known as Gian Carlo Pedrajas, (born 2008), Filipino politician & actor
- Gian Carlo Gamboa Sotto, known as Gian Sotto, (born 1978), Filipino politician & actor
- Gian Carlo Tramontano, nickname of Giovanni Carlo Tramontano, Count of Matera, (1451 – 1514), Italian nobleman
- Gian Carlo Vacchelli (1981 – 2020), Peruvian sports commentator and politician
- Gian Carlo Wick (1909 – 1992), Italian theoretical physicist

== See also ==
- Giancarlo
- Gian-Carlo
