= Giancarlo Pallavicini =

Italian writer and academic

Giancarlo Pallavicini (Desio, February 12, 1931) is an Italian writer and academic.
