= Giancarlo Flati =

Italian painter, researcher and writer (born 1953)

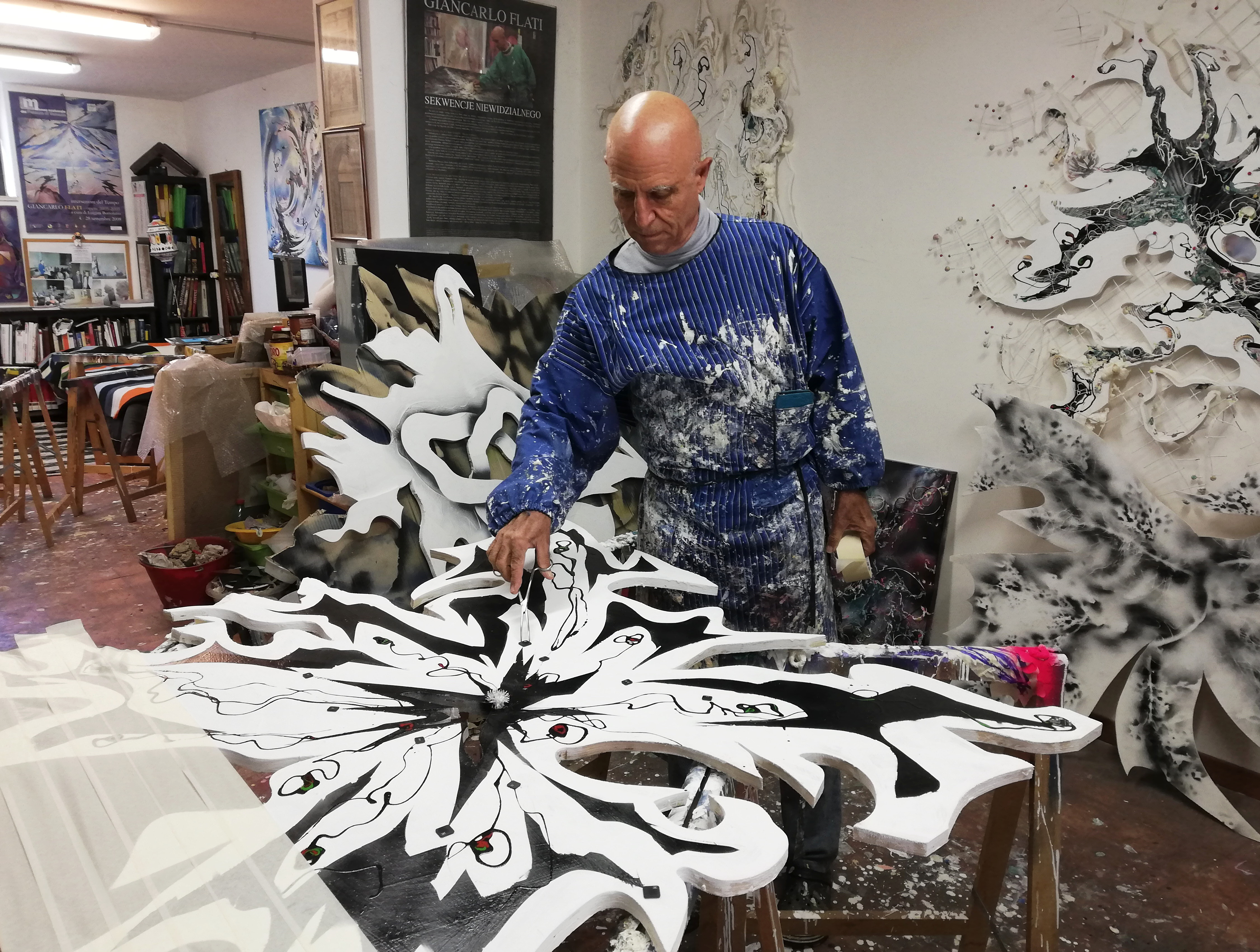
- Flati in 2021
- Born: 11 May 1953 (age 73); L'Aquila, Italy
- Occupations: Artist, painter, researcher, writer
- Website: giancarloflati.com

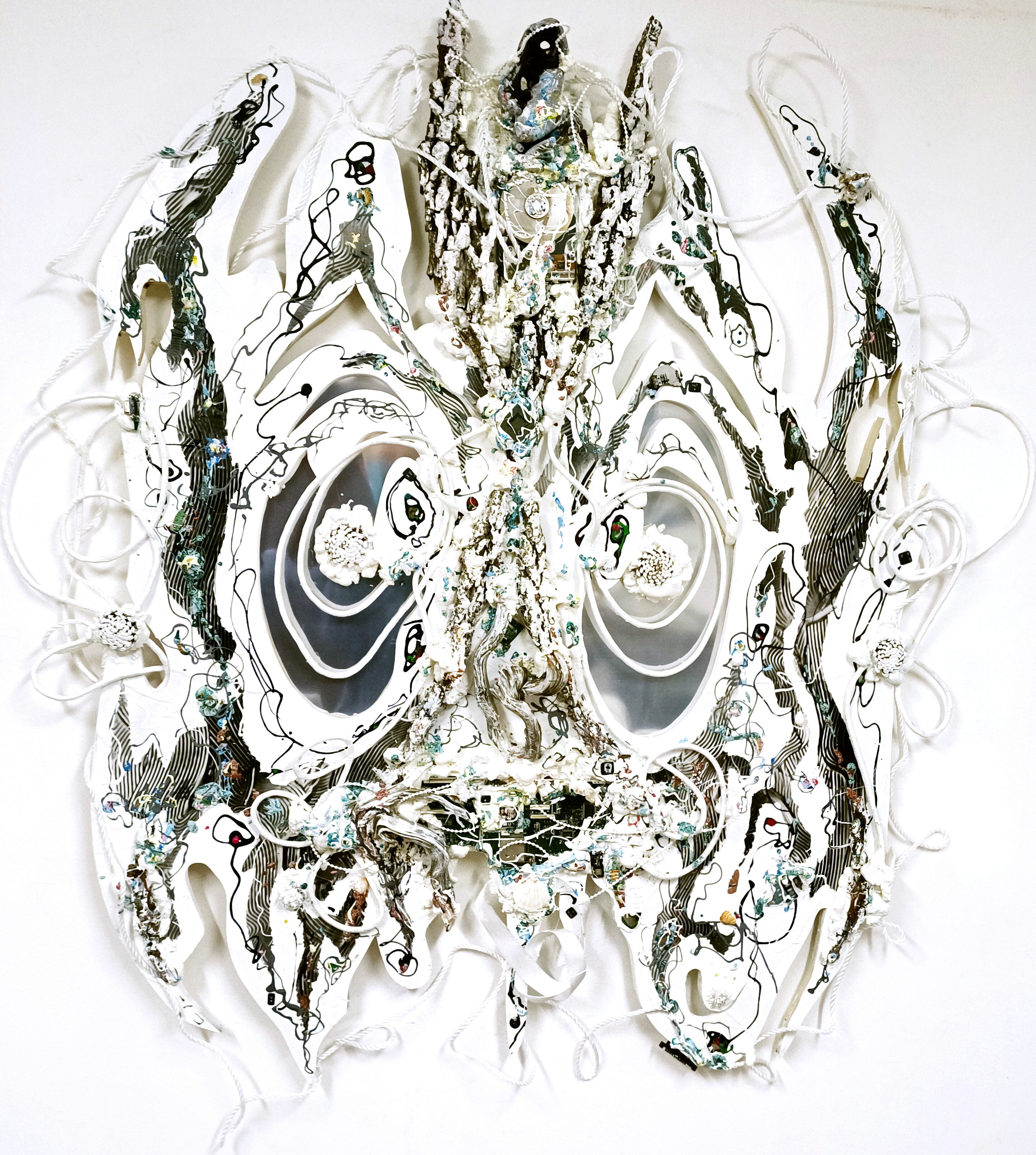
Giancarlo Flati, Ipermaschera immaginaria di Mabits 2 (2021)

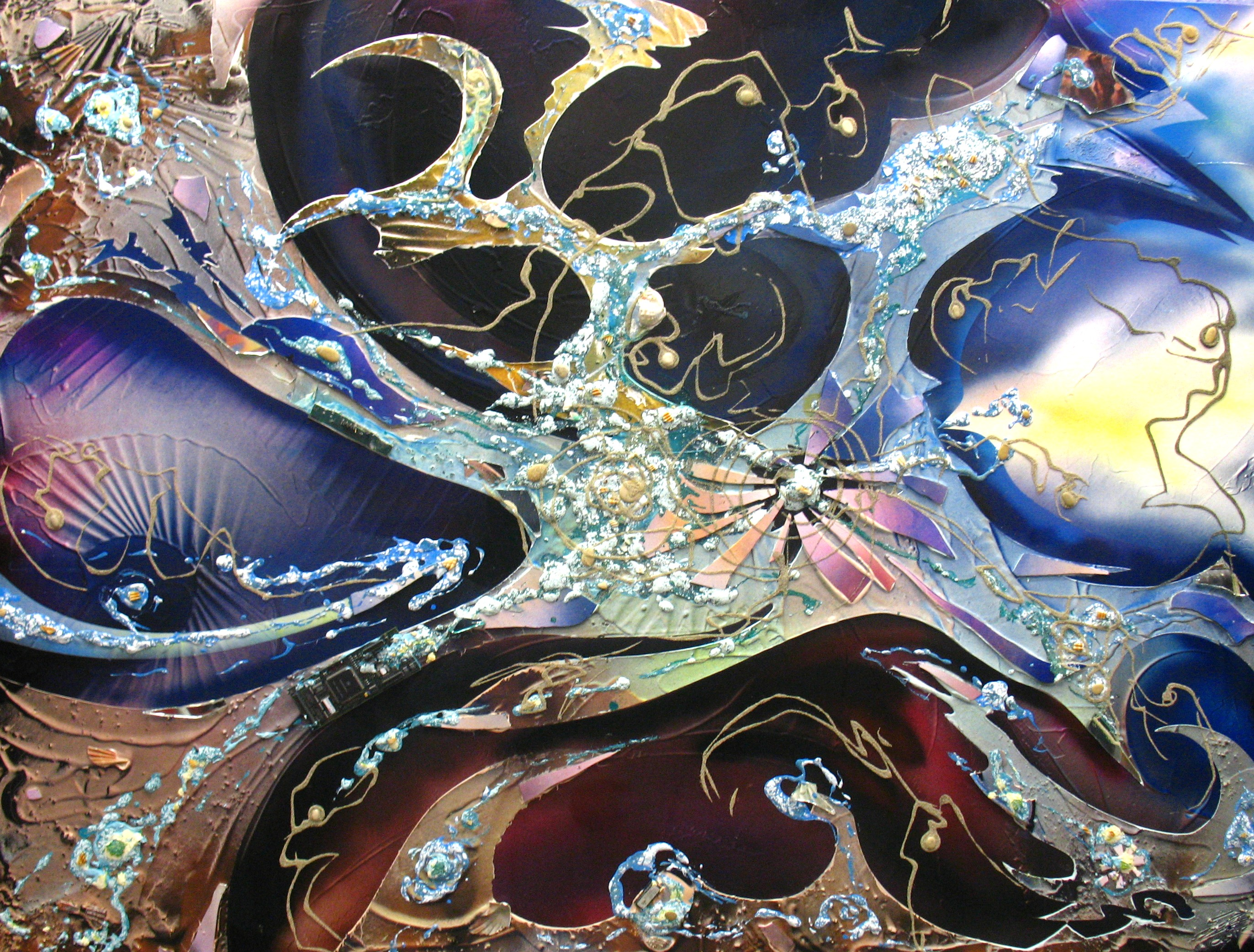
Giancarlo Flati, Carnevale di memorie (2007)

Giancarlo Flati (11 May 1953) is an Italian painter, researcher, and writer.

== Biography ==
Flati is born on 11 May 1953, in L'Aquila, in the region of Abruzzo in central Italy. His artistic production began in 1964.

Since 1972, Flati has been doing artistic and biomedical research in several European Countries (University of L'Aquila, University of Rome "La Sapienza" Rome (Italy), University of Lund (Sweden), Karolinska–Sjukhuset / Karolinska Institutet – Stockholm (Sweden), University of Bergen (Norway), University of Ulm – Marienhospital – Stuttgart (Germany), Gdańsk (Poland), Fords, New Jersey (US). Currently he is active as a painter and writer in L'Aquila, Rome, New Jersey (US).

Flati has performed exhibitions in several European countries, in cultural institutions, in museums and private art galleries. Private and public collections of his works exist in Italy, Sweden, Norway, Denmark, Germany, Poland, Spain, Australia and US.

Flati has been working, until 2009, in the field of Microsurgery and General Surgery. Flati has been docent in Scientific Methodology in the University of Rome "La Sapienza". He is author and coauthor of several surgical books and scientific articles, published worldwide in the fields of microsurgery, male infertility, hepato- pancreatic, gastrointestinal and endocrine surgery.

In 2009, after an earthquake struck and destroyed his hometown of L'Aquila, Flati founded the Cultural Association "Cantiere Aquilano di Cultura Creativa ai Margini della Coscienza", which is now active as a "Think tank" group dedicated to creative consciousness, with a particular attention to the aesthetic implications of the holographic paradigm proposed by Itzhak Bentov, David Bohm and Karl H. Pribram.

In 2017, within the artistic movement of "heavenly aesthetics" theorized by Daniele Radini Tedeschi, Flati has been invited at the Triennial Exhibition of Visual Arts in Rome, Complex of Vittoriano, Ala Brasini. In 2017, he has been invited to participate as a member of "El Circulo Magico" at the National Pavilion of Guatemala - 57. International Art Exhibition - Venice Biennale. On the occasion of the Theme "The Edge" of Guatemala Pavilion, he published the book "On the Edge of Creative Mind" (Preface of Daniele Radini Tedeschi) describing the concepts and theoretical foundations of the works exposed: "I the tree of the Edges" and "From the silence of leaves".

In 2020, Flati founded a new artistic movement, theorising its foundations in the manifesto "The Tree of the Mabits. Manifesto for a new Artistic and Human Renaissance in the Time of Super Intelligent Clouds", published by Aracne Editrice in 2020.

In 2021, Flati participated in the Triennial Exhibition of Visual Arts in Rome at the Palazzo Borghese - Galleria del Cembalo.

In the same year, Flati participated in the ARTInGenioMuseum Award Selection in Pisa with the following works exhibited there permanently: 1) Rhythm's breacktrough 2) Soul theorem. Tribute to Grigory Perelman, 3) Trascendentsd 2.

In 2022, Flati participated for the second time in the 59th International Art Exhibition - La Biennale di Venezia - Grenada Pavilion, where he exhibited his work Immaginary Hypermask of Mabits 2.

Several art critics and editors have been writing about his art:

Flati represents the world in its complexities, grasping the moment in which it organizes itself, shapelessly flowing and defines itself from the first sound of the big bang, bursting and expanding in the euphony of space-time. In the works of Flati there are tangled woods, metallic nodes, electronic boards, broken glass, grains of sand, stones, and nutshell sounds of Triton. Every element has the memory of the arpeggio of the forest, the lapping of the waves, the sounds of electronic machines, the inebriation of the wind meeting the clouds. A new polyphony of space, a new melody with multiple voices, a sort of ars nova, a music between art and science.

— Luigina Bortolatto

Flati is an artist endowed with great awareness. The balance he displays between the spontaneous flow of inspiration and the capacity to reflect on the work produced is a quality seldom found. While he has already been active for a good many years, there can be no doubt about the fact that his work fits in perfectly with the renewal of this new millennium. The master has in fact succeeded over the years in developing a highly personal style, deriving in part also from his specific experiences both in art and in science, to the point of bringing wholly spontaneous impulse into line with the results of intense reflection involving a convergence of psychological, metaphysical, technical and spiritual themes.

— Claudio Strinati

Through the works of Giancarlo Flati we spontaneously learn a new language, a revolutionary language, which is able to replace every artistic invention of the past. It is an art which has the same importance of the revolutions of the past century and without any doubt will become a model for posterity.

— Sandro Serradifalco

(...) Beside the tree, almost like a seedling of the main plant, Flati felt it necessary to include what could be described as the artistic life of his philosophical thought in magma form: the artist's book. The binding is woody, arboreal, made from thick protective bark, while inside the pages give way to extraordinarily powerful evocative works, images heavy with margins, explosions of profound sensitivity, the continued search for other dimensions beyond known spaces. With this book and the “I,Tree of the Edges”, Flati is declaring his faith in contemporary hermeneutics; he is a quiet, hard-working artist unlike avant guard [sic] or postmodern narcissism, a faithful member of the elected community founded on the scientific-but-natural consideration of spirituality.

— Daniele Radini Tedeschi

(...) Giancarlo Flati is a frontier artist, operator and scholar of Margins and Borders because he is active in that subtle and indefinite area where matter meets with mind and fantasy, art with science, visible with invisible and concrete, and the abstract. I like to recall his creation, already presented at the 57th Venice Biennale of Art, the tree of the Margins or the tree of MABits, an emblematic image, symbol and metaphor of time, with the strong hope that it will become the tree of the art of future, which can sprout and produce new fruits, new and different languages, new beauties.

— Daniele Radini Tedeschi

== Awards ==
In 2005, Flati won the Michetti-Museum Prize.

In 2016, Flati won the cover competition for the July/August issue of the magazine Art & Beyond.

== Publications ==
Flati is the author of the following books:

- Flati; Gentile; Lenzi (2006). Varicocele ed infertilità maschile. SEU.
- Flati, Giancarlo (2008). Giancarlo Flati: Intersezioni del Tempo. Matteo Editore.
- Flati, Giancarlo (2012). From Qbits to Time Knots. Nero su Bianco.
- Flati, Giancarlo (2013). Il segreto del pendolo di Bentov. Co-Scienza, estetica dell'invisibile e ordini nascosti. Aracne Editrice.
- Flati, Giancarlo (2015). Attimi di silenzio. Fondazione Mario Luzi Editore.
- Flati, Giancarlo (2017). On the edges of creative mind. Società Editrice Universo.
- Flati, Giancarlo (2020). The tree of Mabits. Manifesto for a new Artistic and Human Renaissance in the coming Age of ASI Clouds (Artificial Superintelligent Clouds). Aracne Editrice. ISBN 978-88-255-3597-6.

His works have been published in the following books, reviews and catalogs:

- Bortolatto, Luigina (2004). Monografia "Giancarlo Flati" - Collana Esmeralda. Zanotto Editore Eurocrom Libri.
- Catalogo dell'Arte Moderna n.42. Mondadori. 2006.
- Catalogo dell'Arte Moderna n.43. Mondadori. 2007.
- Bortolatto, Luigina (2007). "Giancarlo Flati" - Collana Esmeralda, Vol IV. Zanotto Editore.
- Catalogo dell'Arte Moderna n.44. Mondadori. 2008.
- Bortolatto, Luigina (2008). Giancarlo Flati: "Poeta Cosmico". Euroarte XI.
- Avanguardie Artistiche. EA Editore. 2008.
- Catalogo dell'Arte Moderna n.45. Mondadori. 2009.
- Catalogo dell'Arte Moderna n.46. Mondadori. 2010.
- Catalogo dell'Arte Moderna n.47. Mondadori. 2011.
- Catalogo dell'Arte Moderna n.48. Mondadori. 2012.
- International Contemporary Artists Vol VI. ICA Publishing. 2012.
- International Contemporary Masters Vol VI. World Wide Art Books Inc. TM. California. 2012.
- Catalogo dell'Arte Moderna n.49. Mondadori. 2013.
- ATIM's Top 60 Masters of Contemporary Art. ArtTour International Publications. 2013.
- Szollosi, Georgia (2013). Hidden Treasure Art Magazine Yearbook 2014. ArtTour International Publications.
- Catalogo dell'Arte Moderna n.50. Mondadori. 2014.
- Protagonisti dell'Arte 2014. Dal XIX Secolo ad Oggi. EA Editore. 2014.
- Annuario d'Arte Contemporanea. EA Editore. 2014.
- Catalogo dell'Arte Moderna n.51 - Gli artisti italiani dal primo Novecento ad oggi. Mondadori. 2015.
- Artista dell'Anno 2015. EA Editore. 2015.
- Guggenheim issue of World of Art Contemporary Art Magazine. Contemporary Art Magazine. 2020.
- Atlante dell'Arte Contemporanea (n.2). De Agostini. 2020. ISBN 9788851171834.
- Simone Incagnoli (December 2020). "Quando L'Arte diventa scienza". OPRA (Opera Programmatica di Riqualificazione Artistica). 992: 711–713.
