= Limb telescoping =

Shortening of a phantom limb

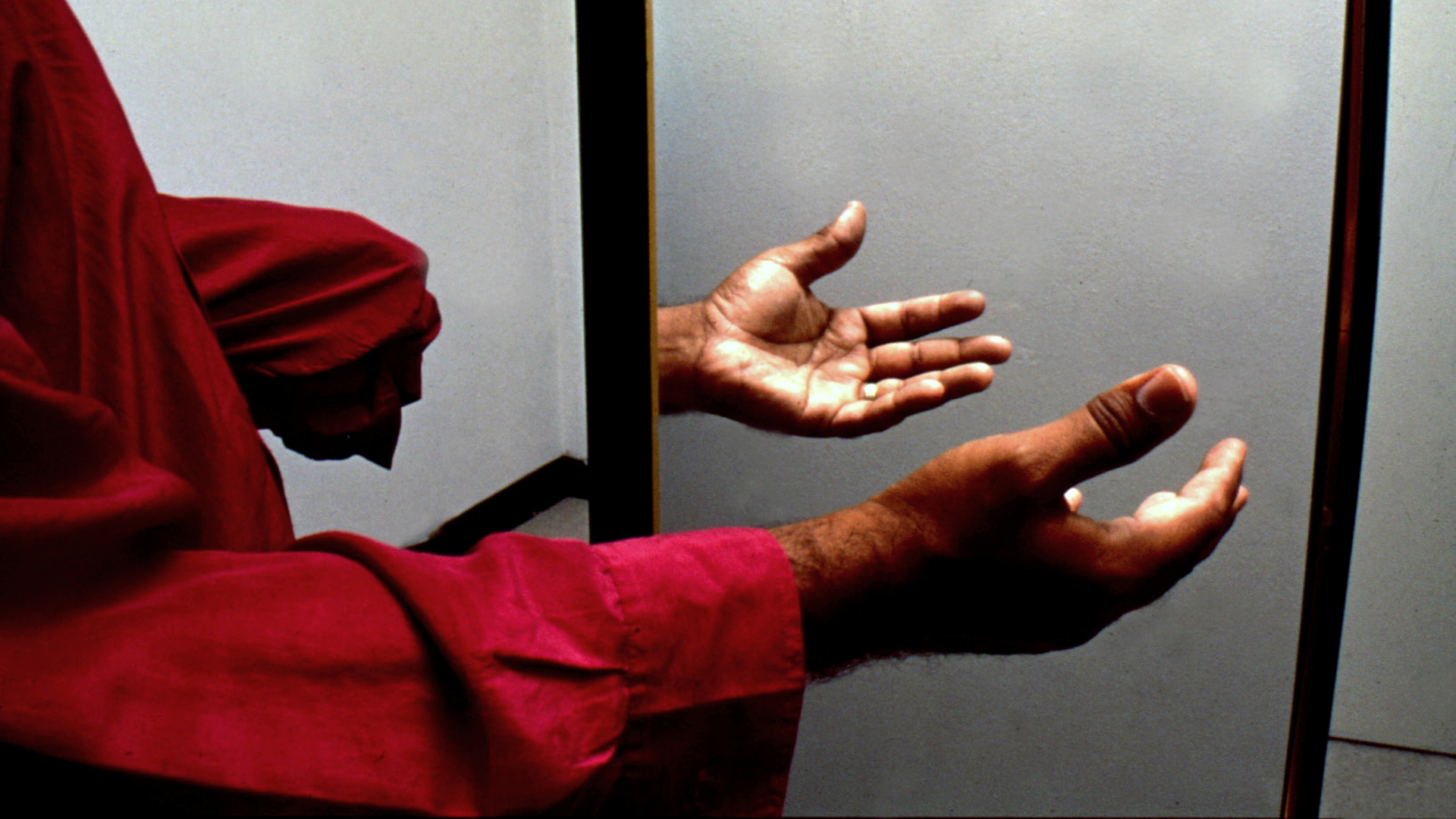
Body Transfer Illusion. therapy used for the treatment of phantom limb pain and analysis of limb telescoping. In this image, the mirror helps to represent the patient's perception of their body.

Limb telescoping is the progressive shortening of a phantom limb as the cortical regions are reorganized following an amputation. During this reorganization, proximal portions of the residual limb are perceived as more distal parts of the phantom limb. Such effect is responsible for increased phantom pain due to the discrepancy between the patient's body perception and their actual body. This effect may last from weeks up to years after post-amputation.

== Neural reorganization ==
=== Brain cortex ===
Following an amputation, there is a neurological reorganization of cortical regions in the brain, where brain regions that were responsible for the amputated limb start to manage remaining body parts, which are commonly related to the residual limb. The presence of this anatomical incongruence causes telescoping sensations because the body representation system is trying to adapt and reduce such mismatch by shortening the phantom limb, until it disappears. Consequently, the greater the limb telescoping effect, the more a phantom limb decreases. This shortening leads to increased phantom limb pain, which explains the correlation between limb telescoping and phantom limb pain.

=== Limb variance ===
The amputation of upper limbs presents a quicker and more efficient neural reorganization than lower limbs. Upper limbs are connected to the brain through axons of the fasciculus cuneatus, while the lower limbs are connected to the brain through axons of the fasciculus gracilis. In addition, upper limb recognition is processed by the most anterior regions of the frontal lobe, which presents more neural connections and they are closely related to higher cognitive functions, such as goal-directed behaviors, working memory, attention, inhibition of distracting thoughts and actions. Meanwhile, the lower limbs are processed by a more posterior region of the brain, which presents a limited amount of connections in the brain. Therefore, the enhanced neural reorganization, combined with the smaller limbs, decreases the duration and the influence of the telescoping effect in upper limbs

== Factors ==
=== Age ===
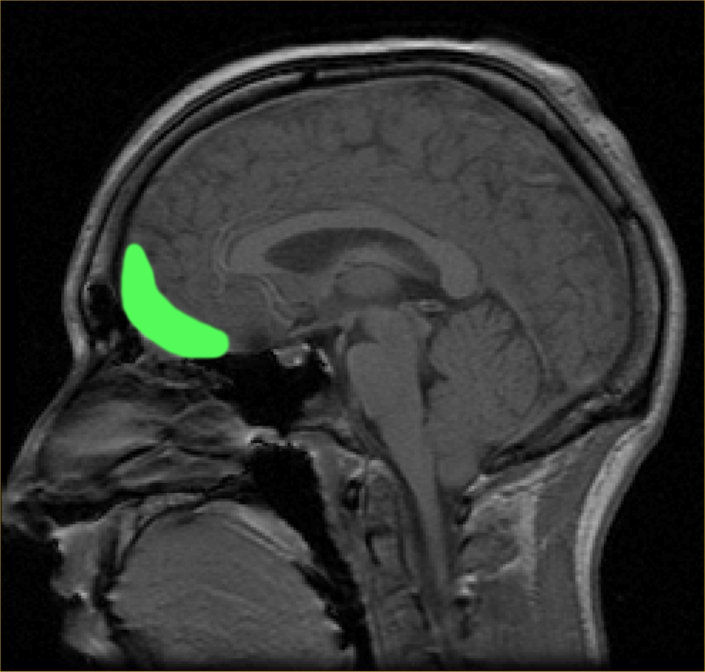
The cerebral cortex is responsible for processing information from the sensory system.

Younger patients with an amputation report phantom limb sensation less frequently than older patients, which leads to a lower incidence of telescoping among them. The primary explanation for this is neural plasticity, which is the ability of the brain to reorganize neural functions according to its necessities. Neural plasticity reduces with time due to a decline in prefrontal cortex (PFC) activity, synaptic connectivity, Ca2+ homeostasis, and network firing properties. In addition, exposure to novel experiences and new skills help individuals adapt and expand their neurological network. As young patients are exposed to new experiences more often, this boosts their neural plasticity, reduces the phantom limb sensation, and the duration of the telescoping effect. In addition, the size of the amputated limb plays a major role in the duration of the telescoping effect because the bigger the amputated limb, the longer limb telescoping takes for the phantom limb to disappear. Therefore, smaller limbs and greater neural plasticity help children overcome the telescoping effect more quickly and smoothly.

=== Traumatic amputation ===
Traumatic amputations generally result from an accident and involve greater levels of pain. It has been observed that phantom limb pain is greater after a traumatic amputation. when compared to a scheduled amputation. During an accident, blast waves along with direct impacts cause nerve injuries, which lead to neurophatic pain. Moreover, displaced bone fragments, heterotrophic ossification, and scar tissue are additional factors that may contribute to greater pain sensation. Another common problem among traumatic amputations is the development of infections, which are more easily prevented during surgical amputation. Infections inhibit the healing process and the regrowth of nerve fibers. Overall, the nervous system faces additional challenges to recover due to greater levels of pain, deprived healing, and medical complications. Thus, the telescoping effect becomes longer (approximately 10 years post-amputation) and more predominant after traumatic amputations

== Intervention ==
=== Induction ===
An experimental research done by Dr. Laura Schmalzl and Dr. Henrik Ehrsson at the Karolinska Institute, in Sweden, showed that body ownership plays a major role in the development of telescoping. In this study, the body transfer illusion was combined with specific experiments and used to activate the telescoping effect. The patients' reactions under the telescoping effect were compared with their reactions when the effect was not present. Under the influence of the telescoping effect, patients with an amputation presented greater anatomical incongruence and pain. Although unrealistic, simulation of the presence of an amputated limb led to a better recognition of body parts, which was indicated by the proprioceptive drift of the induced hand in comparison with the telescoped hand. The induction of the telescoping effect helps us understand how it affects behavioral psychology and body modulation. Overall, the results obtained in this scientific study may help further develop therapeutic techniques for patients experiencing limb telescoping.

=== Therapeutic treatment ===
Upon the unavoidable amputation of a limb, physical therapy may be introduced as an additional medical approach pre- and post-amputation to minimize phantom limb pain and limb telescoping following the surgical procedure. Prior to any intervention, there must be a complete assessment of the patients' condition to identify their issues. Patients require different levels of attention for a variety of needs, such as counseling, physical therapy, rehabilitation, and medication-assisted treatment. The primary aim is to prevent the transition of acute to chronic pain because the telescoping effect is more prevalent among patients experiencing long-lasting pain. Among therapeutic techniques, mirror therapy is used to decrease the telescoping effect and, consequently, pain. This approach is based on the body transfer illusion and uses mirrors to reflect a healthy limb in place of the missing limb. The efficiency of mirror therapy may be enhanced when combined with auditory feedback, which causes the stimulation of multiple senses simultaneously. Another approach is the use of opioids, where treatment starts 48 hours prior to amputation up to 48 hours post-amputation. It has been analyzed that its effects contribute to decrease phantom limb pain up to 6 months post-surgery

=== Psychological impact ===
Psychologically, the main factors of limb telescoping is anxiety and depression, which are closely related to traumatization and physical disability. Patients with an amputation report depression at rates above 50% and anxiety above 35%. Anxiety is usually involved prior to the surgical procedure and at early stages of post-surgical recovery. Depression is mainly observed at early stages of post-amputation recovery. Both anxiety and depression directly impact neural plasticity and prevents proper reorganization of axons. Consequently, these psychological conditions impact recovery and diminishes body recognition, increasing the predominance of limb telescoping. Therefore, counseling plays a major role in helping patients overcome these challenges and better transition with the limitations imposed by an amputation.

== See also ==
- Phantom Pain
- Body Transfer Illusion
- Cerebral Cortex
- Upper limb
