= RSDS =

The acronym RSDS may refer to:

- Reflex Sympathetic Dystrophy Syndrome, the old name of the type I variation of the Complex regional pain syndrome.
- Reduced Swing Differential Signaling, an electronic signaling standard and protocol for a chip-to-chip interface.
