= V. S. Ramachandran =

Indian-American neuroscientist (born 1951)

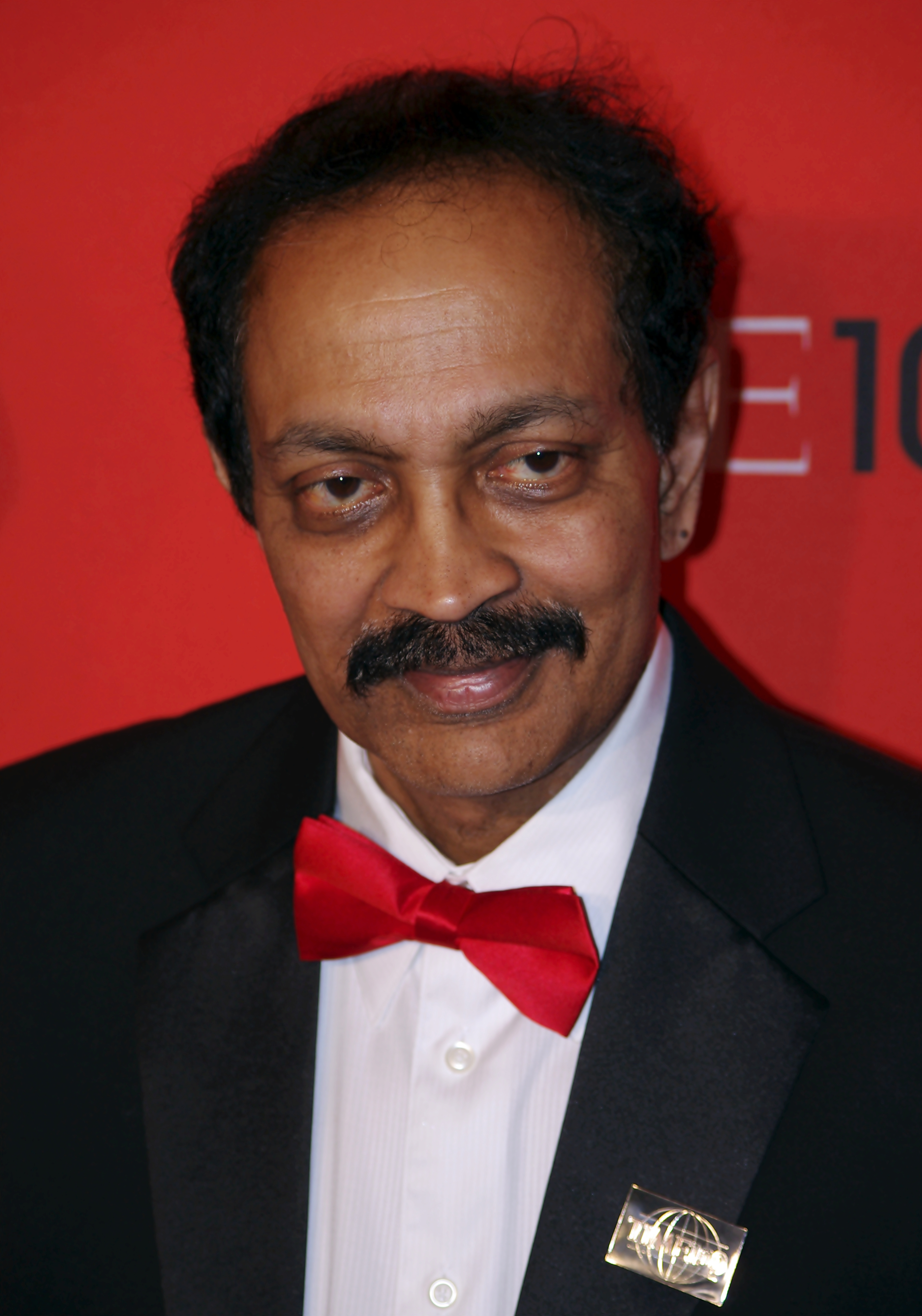
- Ramachandran at the 2011 Time 100 gala
- Born: Vilayanur Subramanian Ramachandran; 10 August 1951 (age 75); Tamil Nadu, India
- Education: Stanley Medical College (MBBS); University of Cambridge (PhD)
- Known for: Research in neurology, visual perception, phantom limbs, synesthesia, autism, body integrity dysphoria, mirror therapy
- Awards: Henry Dale Medal (2005), Padma Bhushan (2007), Scientist of the Year (ARCS Foundation) (2014)
- Scientific career
- Fields: Neurology; Psychology; Phantom Limb
- Workplaces: University of California, San Diego

Vilayanur Subramanian Ramachandran (born 10 August 1951) is an Indian-American neuroscientist. He is known for his experiments and theories in behavioral neurology, including the invention of the mirror box. Ramachandran is a distinguished professor in UCSD's Department of Psychology, where he is the director of the Center for Brain and Cognition.

After earning a medical degree in India, Ramachandran studied experimental neuroscience at Cambridge, obtaining his PhD there in 1978. Most of his research has been in the fields of behavioral neurology and visual psychophysics. After early work on human vision, Ramachandran turned to work on wider aspects of neurology including phantom limbs and phantom pain. Ramachandran also performed the world's first "phantom limb amputation" surgeries by inventing the mirror therapy, which is now widely used for reducing phantom pains (with the goal of eliminating phantom sensations altogether in long term), and also for helping to restore motor control in stroke victims with weakened limbs.

Ramachandran's books Phantoms in the Brain (1998), The Tell-Tale Brain (2010), and others describe neurological and clinical studies of people with synesthesia, Capgras syndrome, and a wide range of other unusual conditions. Ramachandran has also described his work in many public lectures, including lectures for the BBC, and two official TED talks.

== Biography ==
Ramachandran was born in 1951 in Tamil Nadu, India. His mother had a degree in mathematics. His grandfather was Alladi Krishnaswamy Iyer, one of the framers of India's constitution.

Ramachandran's father, V. M. Subramanian, was an engineer who worked for the U.N. Industrial Development Organization and served as a diplomat in Bangkok, Thailand. Ramachandran attended schools in Madras, and British schools in Bangkok.

Ramachandran obtained an M.B.B.S. from Stanley Medical College in Chennai, India.

In 1978, Ramachandran obtained a Ph.D. from Trinity College at the University of Cambridge. Later he moved to the US, where he spent two years at Caltech as a research fellow working with Jack Pettigrew before being appointed assistant professor of psychology at the University of California, San Diego in 1983. He became a full professor there in 1988. He currently holds the rank of distinguished professor in the UCSD Psychology Department, and is the director of its Center for Brain and Cognition, where he works with graduate students and researchers from UCSD and elsewhere on emerging theories in neuroscience. As of July 2019, Ramachandran is also a professor in the UCSD Medical School's Neurosciences program. and an adjunct professor at the Salk Institute for Biological Studies.

In 1987, Ramachandran married a fellow scientist who became his frequent co-author as Diane Rogers-Ramachandran. They have two sons, Chandramani and Jaya.

Ramachandran's scientific work can be divided into two phases. From the early 1970s until the late 1980s, Ramachandran's work focused almost exclusively on human visual processing, especially on stereopsis. Ramachandran began publishing research in this area beginning in 1972, with a paper in Nature while still a student at Stanley Medical College.

In 1991, Ramachandran was inspired by Tim Pons's research on cortical plasticity. Pons demonstrated cortical reorganization in monkeys after the amputation of a finger. Ramachandran was one of the first researchers to recognize the potential of neuroimaging technology to demonstrate the plastic changes that take place in the human cortex after amputation. Ramachandran then began research on phantom limbs, but later moved on to study a wider range of neurological mysteries, including body integrity dysphoria and the Capgras delusion.

Ramachandran has encountered skepticism about some of his theories. Ramachandran has responded, "I have—for better or worse—roamed the whole landscape of visual perception, stereopsis, phantom limbs, denial of paralysis, Capgras syndrome, synaesthesia, and many others."

Ramachandran has served as a consultant in areas such as forensic psychology and the neuroscience of weight reduction. In 2007, Ramachandran served as an expert witness on pseudocyesis (false pregnancy) at the trial of Lisa Marie Montgomery. Ramachandran has served as a consultant to the Modius company which is developing weight reduction technology that relies on electrically stimulating parts of the brain that control weight loss.

In his scientific work, Ramachandran often uses simple equipment, such as mirrors or old-fashioned stereoscopes, rather than complex brain imaging technologies such as fMRI. Ramachandran has been outspoken about his intuition-based approach to studying the brain. In an interview with Frontline magazine Ramachandran stated:

Intuition is what gets you started; then you need empirical studies... brain-imaging technology often lulls you into a false sense of having understood what's going on. So sometimes, not having technology - that's my own approach and that of some of my colleagues, we use it only when it's absolutely essential, just like medical diagnostics. We rely more on intuition in doing simple experiments, because if you rely on fancy medical imaging, you become less creative.

== Research and theory ==
=== Phantom limbs ===
When an arm or leg is amputated, patients often continue to feel vividly the presence of the missing limb as a "phantom limb" (an average of 80%). Building on earlier work by Ronald Melzack (McGill University) and Timothy Pons (NIMH), Ramachandran theorized that there was a link between the phenomenon of phantom limbs and neural plasticity in the adult human brain. To test this theory, Ramachandran recruited amputees, so that he could learn more about if phantom limbs could "feel" a stimulus to other parts of the body.

In 1992, in collaboration with T.T. Yang, S. Gallen, and others at the Scripps Research Institute who were conducting MEG research, Ramachandran initiated a project to demonstrate that there had been measurable changes in the somatosensory cortex of a patient who had undergone an arm amputation.

Ramachandran theorized that there was a relationship between the cortical reorganization evident in the MEG image and the non-painful referred sensations he had observed in other subjects.

Later researchers found that non-painful phantom limbs correlated less with motor or somatosensory plasticity than painful phantom limbs. Recent research has also shown that the peripheral nervous system is involved in painful phantom limb phenomena.

Research continues into more precise mechanisms and explanations.

=== Mirror visual feedback/mirror therapy ===
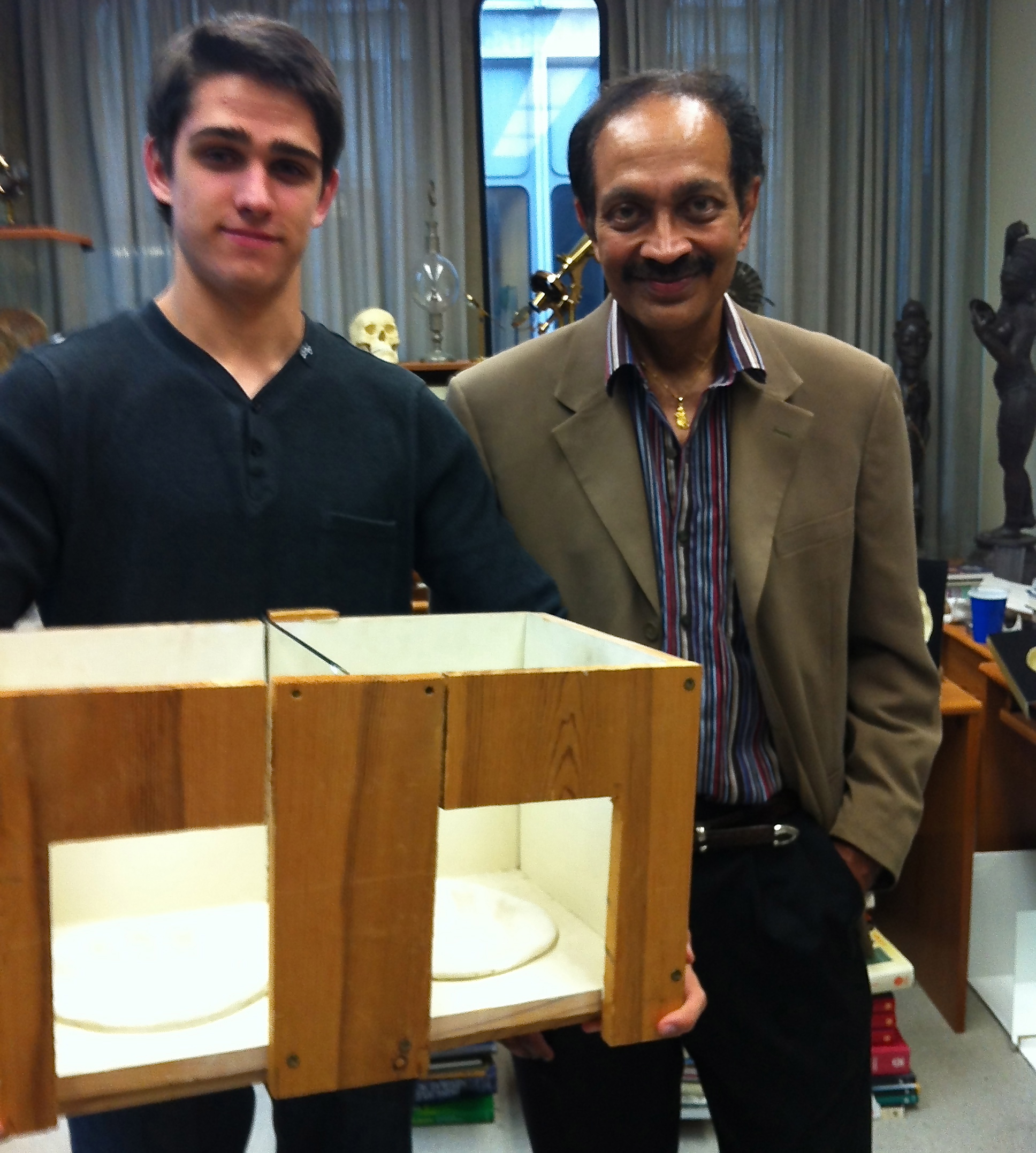
Ramachandran standing next to the original mirror box

Writing in 2009, John Colapinto (author of Ramachandran's profile in The New Yorker) said that mirror box therapy for amputees was Ramachandran's most noted achievement.

Ramachandran thought that phantom pain might be caused by the mismatch between different parts of an amputee's nervous systems: the visual system says the limb is missing, but the somatosensory system (processing body sensations such as touch and limb position) says the limb is still there. The so-called mirror box was a simple apparatus that uses a mirror reflecting an amputee's good arm so it appears to be the extension of the one missing:

They put their surviving arm through a hole in the side of a box with a mirror inside, so that, peering through the open top, they would see their arm and its mirror image, as if they had two arms. Ramachandran then asked them to move both their intact arm and, in their mind, their phantom arm—to pretend that they were conducting an orchestra, say. The patients had the sense that they had two arms again.

Ramachandran found that in some cases restoring movement to a paralyzed phantom limb reduced the pain experienced. In 1999 Ramachandran and Eric Altschuler expanded the mirror technique from amputees to improving the muscle control of stroke patients with weakened limbs. As Deconick et al. state in a 2014 review, the mechanism of improved motor control may differ from the mechanism of pain relief.

Despite the introduction of mirror therapy in the late 1990s, little research was published on it before 2009, and much of the research since then has been of contested quality. Out of 115 publications between 2012 and 2017 about using mirror therapy to treat phantom limb pain, a 2018 review, found only 15 studies whose scientific results should be considered. From these 15 studies, the reviewers concluded that "MT seems to be effective in relieving PLP, reducing the intensity and duration of daily pain episodes. It is a valid, simple, and inexpensive treatment for PLP." Similarly, a 2017 review that studied a wider range of uses for mirror therapy, concluded, "Mirror therapy has been used to treat phantom limb pain, complex regional pain syndrome, neuropathy and low back pain. The mechanism of action of mirror therapy remains uncertain, and the evidence for clinical efficacy of mirror therapy is encouraging, but not yet definitive."

=== Mirror neurons ===
Mirror neurons were first reported in a paper published in 1992 by a team of researchers led by Giacomo Rizzolatti at the University of Parma. According to Rizzolati, "Mirror neurons are a specific type of visuomotor neuron that discharge both when a monkey executes a motor act and when it observes a similar motor act performed by another individual."

In 2000, Ramachandran made what he called some "purely speculative conjectures" that "mirror neurons [in humans] will do for psychology what DNA did for biology: they will provide a unifying framework and help explain a host of mental abilities that have hitherto remained mysterious and inaccessible to experiments."

Ramachandran has suggested that research into the role of mirror neurons could help explain a variety of human mental capacities such as empathy, imitation learning, and the evolution of language. In a 2001 essay for Edge, Ramachandran speculated that

I suggested that in addition to providing a neural substrate for figuring out another persons intentions...the emergence and subsequent sophistication of mirror neurons in hominids may have played a crucial role in many quintessentially human abilities such as empathy, learning through imitation (rather than trial and error), and the rapid transmission of what we call "culture". (And the "great leap forward" — the rapid Lamarckian transmission of "accidental") one-of-a kind inventions.

Ramchandran's speculations about the connection of mirror neurons with empathy have been contested by some authors and supported by others.

=== "Broken Mirrors" theory of autism ===
In 1999, Ramachandran, in collaboration with then post-doctoral fellow Eric Altschuler and colleague Jaime Pineda, hypothesized that a dysfunction of mirror neuron activity might be responsible for some of the symptoms and signs of autism spectrum disorders. Between 2000 and 2006 Ramachandran and his colleagues at UC San Diego published a number of articles in support of this theory, which became known as the "Broken Mirrors" theory of autism. Ramachandran and his colleagues did not measure mirror neuron activity directly; rather they demonstrated that children with ASD showed abnormal EEG responses (known as Mu wave suppression) when they observed the activities of other people. In The Tell-Tale Brain (2010), Ramachandran states that the evidence for mirror-neuron dysfunction in autism is "compelling but not conclusive."

The contention that mirror neurons play a role in autism has been extensively discussed and researched.

=== Neural basis of synesthesia ===
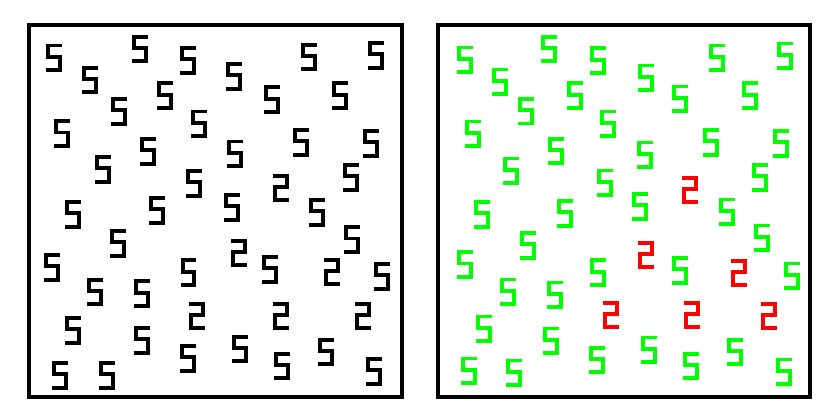
Synesthetes who experience color when viewing different symbols may quickly identify the presence of the "triangle" in the left-hand image.

Ramachandran was one of the first scientists to theorize that grapheme-color synesthesia arises from a cross-activation between brain regions. Ramachandran and his graduate student, Ed Hubbard, conducted research with functional magnetic resonance imaging that found increased activity in the color recognition areas of the brain in synesthetes compared to non-synesthetes. Ramachandran has speculated that conceptual metaphors may also have a neurological basis in cortical cross-activation. As of 2015, the neurological basis of synesthesia had not been established.

=== Xenomelia (apotemnophilia) ===
In 2008, Ramachandran, along with David Brang and Paul McGeoch, published the first paper to theorize that apotemnophilia is a neurological disorder caused by damage to the right parietal lobe of the brain. This rare disorder, in which a person desires the amputation of a limb, was first identified by John Money in 1977. Building on medical case studies that linked brain damage to syndromes such as somatoparaphrenia (lack of limb ownership), the authors speculated that the desire for amputation could be related to changes in the right parietal lobe. In 2011, McGeoch, Brang and Ramachandran reported a functional imaging experiment involving four subjects who desired lower limb amputations. MEG scans demonstrated that their right superior parietal lobules were significantly less active in response to tactile stimulation of a limb that the subjects wished to have amputated, as compared to age- and sex-matched controls. The authors introduced the word xenomelia to describe this syndrome, which is derived from the Greek for "foreign" and "limb".

=== "Phantom sex" theory of gender incongruence ===
In 2008, Ramachandran, along with McGeoch, published the first paper to theorize that gender dysphoria is caused by "a mis-match between the brain's hardwired gender-specific body image and the external somatic gender". The authors surveyed a group of trans women about their experiences of phantom penile sensations following gender-affirming surgery, as well as a group of trans men. Responses showed that trans women experienced phantom penile sensations at significantly lower rates than cis men who have undergone a penectomy. Conversely, trans men experienced phantom penile sensations at equal rates to cis men. In 2017, Laura Case, Brang, Ramachandran, and some other authors, found that trans men experience altered brain activity in regions associated with body integrity disorder when their breasts are touched. They found alterations of white matter in these regions of the brain too.

=== Obsessive-compulsive disorder (OCD) ===
Ramachandran, with Baland Jalal and colleagues, conducted the first studies using the rubber hand illusion to investigate self-representation in obsessive-compulsive disorder (OCD). In these studies, contaminating a rubber hand with fake feces during the illusion led participants without OCD to report OCD-like disgust. Follow-up work with Jalal and Richard McNally found that OCD patients were more susceptible to the illusion, sometimes even when visual and tactile cues were out of sync, suggesting a more flexible body image. The research also explored using the illusion as an indirect exposure technique, offering a potential gentler alternative to traditional treatments.

In 2017, Ramachandran and Jalal found that individuals with OCD symptoms felt disgust simply by watching an experimenter contaminate himself—and relief, after self-contamination, by watching him wash his hands. In 2021, these findings were extended to a clinical OCD population. Exploring clinical implications, and working with Jalal and Barbara Sahakian, they found that individuals with contamination fears showed improved symptoms after watching brief daily smartphone videos of themselves touching fake feces or washing their hands for one week.

== Popularity ==
Ramachandran is the author of several books on neurology such as Phantoms in the Brain (1998) and The Tell-Tale Brain (2010). Phantoms in the Brain became the basis for a 2001 PBS Nova special.

In 2003, the BBC chose Ramachandran to deliver that year's Reith Lectures, a series of radio lectures. Ramachandran's five radio talks on the topic "The Emerging Mind" were afterward published as a book with the same title.

Ramachandran has also given talks, including TED talks in 2007 and 2010.

In 1997, Newsweek included him on a list of one hundred "personalities whose creativity or talent or brains or leadership will make a difference in the years ahead." In 2008, Foreign Policy included Ramachandran as one of its "World's Top 100 Public Intellectuals." Similarly, in 2011, Time listed Ramachandran as one of "the most influential people in the world" on the "Time 100 list".

== Awards and honors ==
Ramachandran has received many academic and other honors. For example, from his biography at Edge.org:

In 2005 he was awarded the Henry Dale Medal and elected to an honorary life membership by the Royal Institution of Great Britain, where he also gave a Friday evening discourse (joining the ranks of Michael Faraday, Thomas Huxley, Humphry Davy and others.) His other honours and awards include fellowships from All Souls College, Oxford, and from Stanford University (Hilgard Visiting Professor); the Presidential Lecture Award from the American Academy of Neurology, two honorary doctorates, the annual Ramon y Cajal award from the International Neuropsychiatry Society, and the Ariens Kappers medal from the Royal Netherlands Academy of Sciences.

In 2007, the president of India conferred on him the third highest civilian award and honorific title in India, the Padma Bhushan.

In 2014, the ARCS Foundation (Achievement Rewards for College Scientists) named Ramachandran its "Scientist of the Year."

== Publications ==
- Phantoms in the Brain: Probing the Mysteries of the Human Mind, coauthor Sandra Blakeslee, 1998 (ISBN 0-688-17217-2).
- Encyclopedia of the Human Brain (editor-in-chief), three volumes, 2002 (ISBN 0-12-227210-2).
- The Emerging Mind, 2003 (ISBN 1-86197-303-9).
- A Brief Tour of Human Consciousness: From Impostor Poodles to Purple Numbers, 2005 (ISBN 0-13-187278-8; paperback edition).
- The Tell-Tale Brain: A Neuroscientist's Quest for What Makes Us Human, 2010 (ISBN 978-0-393-07782-7).
- The Encyclopedia of Human Behavior (editor-in-chief), four-volume second edition, 2012 (ISBN 978-0-12-375000-6).

== See also ==
- Body image
- Oliver Sacks
- Phantom limb
- Phantom pain
- Synesthesia
- Sound symbolism (phonaesthesia)
- Temporal lobe epilepsy
- List of people named in the Epstein files
