= Phantoms in the Brain =

Popular science book by V.S. Ramachandran and Sandra Blakeslee

Phantoms in the Brain: Probing the Mysteries of the Human Mind
- Author: Sandra Blakeslee, Vilayanur S. Ramachandran
- Subject: neurophysiology, neuropsychology, neurological disorder, philosophy of mind
- Publisher: William Morrow and Company, HarperCollins

Phantoms in the Brain: Probing the Mysteries of the Human Mind (also published as Phantoms in the Brain: Human Nature and the Architecture of the Mind) is a 1998 popular science book by neuroscientist V.S. Ramachandran and New York Times science writer Sandra Blakeslee, discussing neurophysiology and neuropsychology as revealed by case studies of neurological disorders.

The book, which began as a lecture presented to the Society for Neuroscience, features a foreword by neuroscientist and author Oliver Sacks.

== Synopsis ==
Ramachandran discusses his work with patients exhibiting phantom limbs, the Capgras delusion, pseudobulbar affect and hemispatial neglect following stroke, and religious experiences associated with epileptic seizure, among other disorders. Ramachandran uses these cases to illustrate the construction of body image, and the functioning of mood, decision-making, self-deception, and artistic skill.

In the final chapter of the book, Ramachandran addresses the so-called hard problem of consciousness, discussing qualia and various facets of the self.

== Reception ==
Neurology researcher Michael E. Goldberg, writing for The New York Times, described the book as "enthralling not only for its clear, eloquent descriptions of neurological phenomena, their relationship to physiological mechanisms and their integration with philosophy of mind, but also for its portrait of Ramachandran, the enthusiast in search of the secrets of the human mind." On Ramachandran's discursion on consciousness, Goldberg writes, "Here he fails, simply because neuroscience has no clue yet how to render the self concrete...but it is a noble failure."

Francis Crick wrote of the book, "The style is lively and informative, and enlivened by unexpected touches of humor. Through it all shines Rama's good sense, his hard-headedness and his humanity." Kirkus Reviews wrote that "Ramachandran, who likens himself to a sleuth and has boundless curiosity, leads readers on a riveting trail of detection."

The book has been translated into Spanish, French, Japanese, German, Korean, Turkish, Italian, Dutch, and Greek.
