= Paul McGeoch =

Paul McGeoch is a Scottish neuroscientist living in California, United States, known primarily for his work in apotemnophilia and neuro-based weight loss.

== Work ==
McGeoch conducts research on apotemnophilia, also known as body integrity identity disorder, in which a person desires the amputation of a limb. The disorder was disorder was first identified by John Money in 1977.

In 2011, McGeoch and colleagues carried out an experiment involving four subjects in which brain scans showed that the right superior parietal lobe was less than fully responsive to tactile stimulation of limb areas that the subjects wished to have amputated. McGeoch and his co-researchers concluded that the images suggest "that inadequate activation of the right superior parietal lobe leads to the unnatural situation in which the sufferers can feel the limb in question being touched without it actually incorporating into their body image, with a resulting desire for amputation". The question of which areas of the brain may be linked to syndromes such as somatopraraphrenia remains unresolved. The authors introduced the word "xenomelia" to describe this syndrome.

In 2012, McGeoch and V. S. Ramachandran published a case study of a woman with an amputated right hand who "sprouted" a phantom hand that contained five digits, including two digits that had not been present at birth.

In 2015, McGeoch co-founded Neurovalens, a health technology start-up. The company developed a headband that targets appetite and cravings to help users lose weight.
