= The Tell-Tale Brain =

2010 book by Vilayanur Ramachandran

The Tell-Tale Brain: A Neuroscientist's Quest for What Makes Us Human
- Author: Vilayanur S. Ramachandran
- Language: English
- Subject: Neuroscience
- Genre: Non-fiction
- Publisher: W. W. Norton & Company
- Publication date: January 17, 2011
- Pages: 357
- ISBN: 978-0-393-07782-7

The Tell-Tale Brain: A Neuroscientist's Quest for What Makes Us Human is a 2010 nonfiction book by V. S. Ramachandran that explores the uniqueness of human nature from a neurological viewpoint.

== Synopsis ==
Ramachandran discusses seven main concepts which define the human aspect of self and how each may be disrupted by a specific neurological disorder. The concepts are: unity, continuity, embodiment, privacy, social embedding, free will, and self-awareness.

In the first chapter, Ramachandran discusses the human ability to change and adapt, illustrating the concept from his work on phantom limbs. The second chapter describes some of his work with visual perception and cognition, addressing the concept of human awareness.

In chapter three, he connects ideas about synesthesia to creativity. Chapters four and five talk about mirror neurons, while chapter six discusses human language.

Ramachandran proposes "nine laws of aesthetics," which he discusses in chapters seven and eight. The final chapter, chapter nine, "The Ape With A Soul" concerns introspection and human self-awareness.

== Reception ==
Tell-Tale Brain was on the New York Times best-seller list (Number 32 on the Hardcover Nonfiction list). It received mostly positive reviews, with some criticism particularly focusing on Ramachandran's theories about mirror neurons. The book won the 2010 Vodafone Crossword Book Award (Non-Fiction).

=== Pre-publication endorsements (book blurbs) ===
The neurologist Oliver Sacks wrote: "No one is better than V. S. Ramachandran at combining minute, careful observation with ingenious experiments and bold, adventurous theorizing. The Tell-Tale Brain is Ramachandran at his best, a profoundly intriguing and compelling guide to the intricacies of the human brain."

The scientist Allan Snyder said of the book: "A masterpiece. The best of its kind and beautifully crafted. Alluring story telling, building to a penetrating understanding of what it is to be uniquely human. Ramachandran is the foremost pioneer—the Galileo—of neurocognition."

The psychiatrist Norman Doidge offered the following praise for the book:

Ramachandran is the modern wizard of neuroscience. In The Tell-Tale Brain, we see the genius at work, tackling extraordinary cases, many of which mark turning points in neuroscientific knowledge. We see him hypothesizing, experimenting, failing, having epiphanies, experimenting, succeeding. In this utterly entertaining account, we see how these fascinating cases fit together, and how he uses them to explain, from a Darwinian point of view, how our brains, though evolved from those of other animals, become neurologically distinct and fundamentally human.

=== Book reviews ===
James McConnachie wrote in the Sunday Times:

When VS Ramachandran, one of the world’s most influential neurologists, wants to get inside a human head, he doesn’t reach for his scalpel or MRI scanner. Instead, like Sherlock Holmes (to whom he is often compared), he seizes on an oddity in a case study, then begins a pleasing process of deduction interspersed with leaps of excitingly creative thought. This absorbing book charts the acclaimed experiments he has performed around the world and at the University of California’s cutting-edge Centre for the Brain, and explains how they have helped unravel the workings of the human mind."

Writing in The New York Times, Anthony Gottlieb generally recommended the book but criticized Ramachandran for not mentioning how controversial some of his ideas about mirror neurons are:

Although Ramachandran admits that his account of the significance of mirror neurons is speculative, he doesn’t let on just how controversial it is... Even if mirror neurons turn out not to be quite as important as Ramachandran thinks—he has elsewhere predicted that they will do for psychology what DNA did for biology—the book is packed with other evidence that neuroscience has made illuminating progress in recent years. Reading such accounts of exactly what our brains get up to is apt to leave one with the disconcerting thought that they are often a lot cleverer than their owners realize.

The philosopher Colin McGinn praised the book in the New York Review of Books despite criticizing it for reductionism/oversimplification, saying:

Ramachandran discusses an enormous range of syndromes and topics in The Tell-Tale Brain. His writing is generally lucid, charming, and informative, with much humor to lighten the load of Latinate brain disquisitions. He is a leader in his field and is certainly an ingenious and tireless researcher. This is the best book of its kind that I have come across for scientific rigor, general interest, and clarity—though some of it will be a hard slog for the uninitiated.

The philosopher Raymond Tallis praised the book in The Wall Street Journal but complained that Ramachandran has failed to provide the research needed to back up some of his theories, concluding:

Until we clear up the ground-floor aspects of human consciousness—in particular, first-person being—claims to advance our understanding of its higher levels, and of the grand edifice of civilization, by peering into intra cranial darkness will not withstand even the most cursory examination. ...The Tell-Tale Brain, though it is engagingly written and often fascinating, reminds us how little cause we have to privilege what the neuro scientists tell us about what makes us human over the testimony of novelists, poets, social workers or philosophers.

Nicholas Shakespeare wrote in The Daily Telegraph:

Ramachandran wanders along intriguing neural pathways, pausing to investigate strange disorders, but he leaves the impression that he is an explorer who has yet to leave the coast. Further, he appears not fully to appreciate that the interior of this vast continent he is mapping may be at war. His book is intermittently fascinating, but is not important in the way of Iain McGilchrist The Master and His Emissary, last year’s magisterial study of the brain’s two opposed hemispheres...

Writing in American Scientist, Simon Baron-Cohen said he found the book stimulating and enjoyable but devoted most of his review to questioning the validity of Ramachandran's views on mirror neurons and the broken-mirror theory of autism, saying for example:

There are also clinical and experimental reasons for being skeptical of the broken-mirror theory of autism... As an explanation of autism, the Broken Mirror theory offers some tantalizing clues; however, some problematic counter-evidence challenges the theory and particularly its scope.
