= Mirror therapy =

Treatment for some kinds of pain

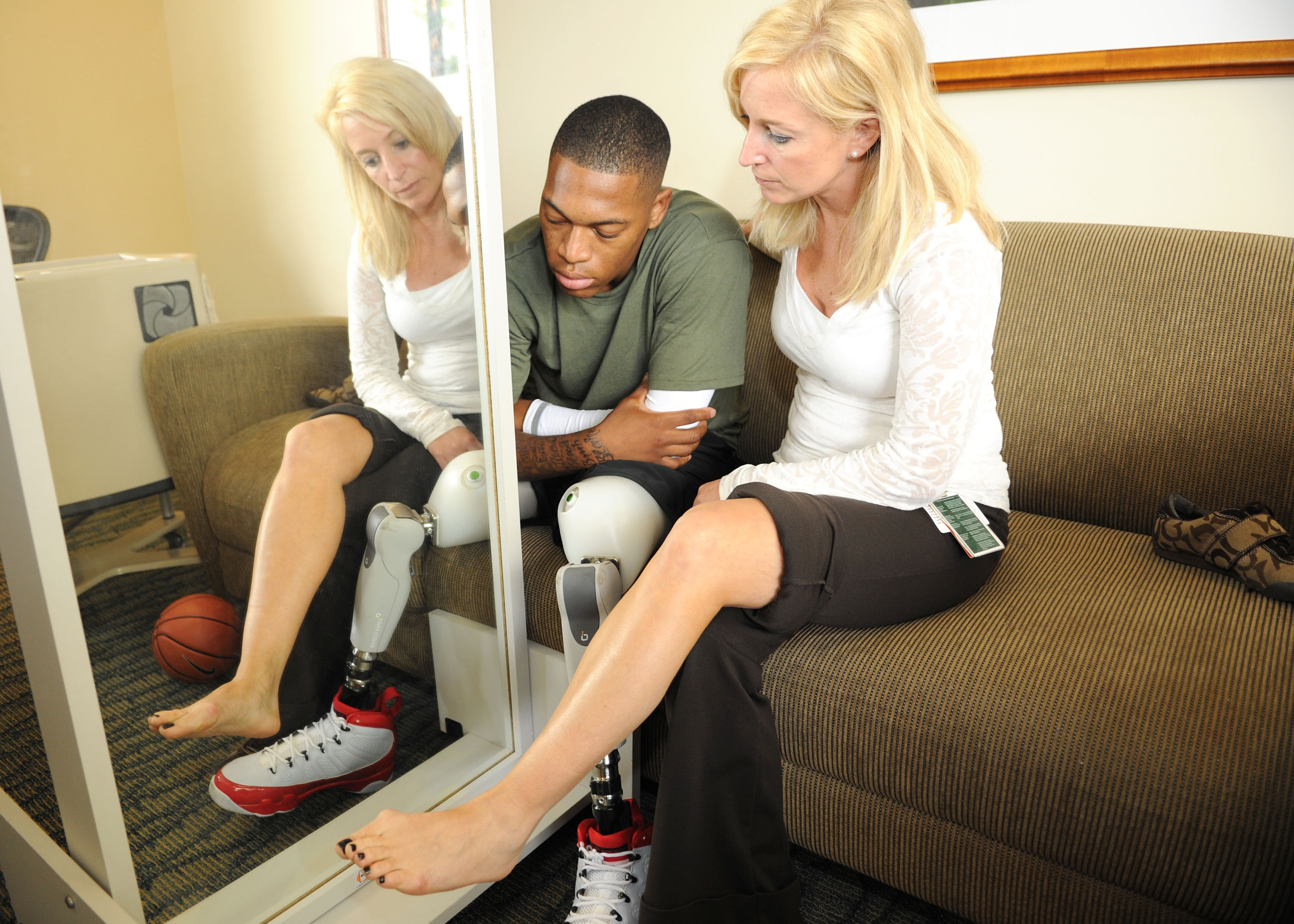
An occupational therapy assistant using mirror therapy to address phantom pain

Mirror therapy (MT) or mirror visual feedback (MVF) is a therapy for pain or disability that affects one side of the patient more than the other side. It was invented in the 1990s (Note: Disputed date with sources claiming either 1992 or 1996:) by Vilayanur S. Ramachandran to treat patients whose limb had been amputated and who had phantom limb pain (PLP). Ramachandran created a visual (and psychological) illusion of two intact limbs by putting the patient's affected limb into a "mirror box," with a mirror down the center (facing toward a patient's intact limb).

The patient then looks into the mirror on the side with the good limb and makes "mirror symmetric" movements, as a symphony conductor might, or as a person does when they clap their hands. The goal is for the patient to imagine regaining control over a missing limb. Because the subject is seeing the reflected image of the good limb moving, it appears as if the phantom limb is also moving. Through the use of this artificial visual feedback, it becomes possible for the patient to "move" the phantom limb and to unclench it from potentially painful positions.

Mirror therapy has expanded beyond its origin in treating phantom limb pain to the treatment of other kinds of one-sided pain or disability, for instance, hemiparesis in post-stroke patients and limb pain in patients with complex regional pain syndrome.

There are contraindications for mirror therapy including neurological or psychological comorbidities, visions issues, and pain in the intact limb. For the therapy to be effective, it is suggested that sessions should last 20-30 minutes three times a week. When taking a patient through mirror therapy, therapists should watch out for side effects including dizziness, confusion, and “telescopic distraction”. Some researchers caution that mirror therapy may interfere either with early prosthetic fitting by delaying integration of new body image and moto patterns required for every day prosthesis use.

== Post-amputation phantom limb pain ==
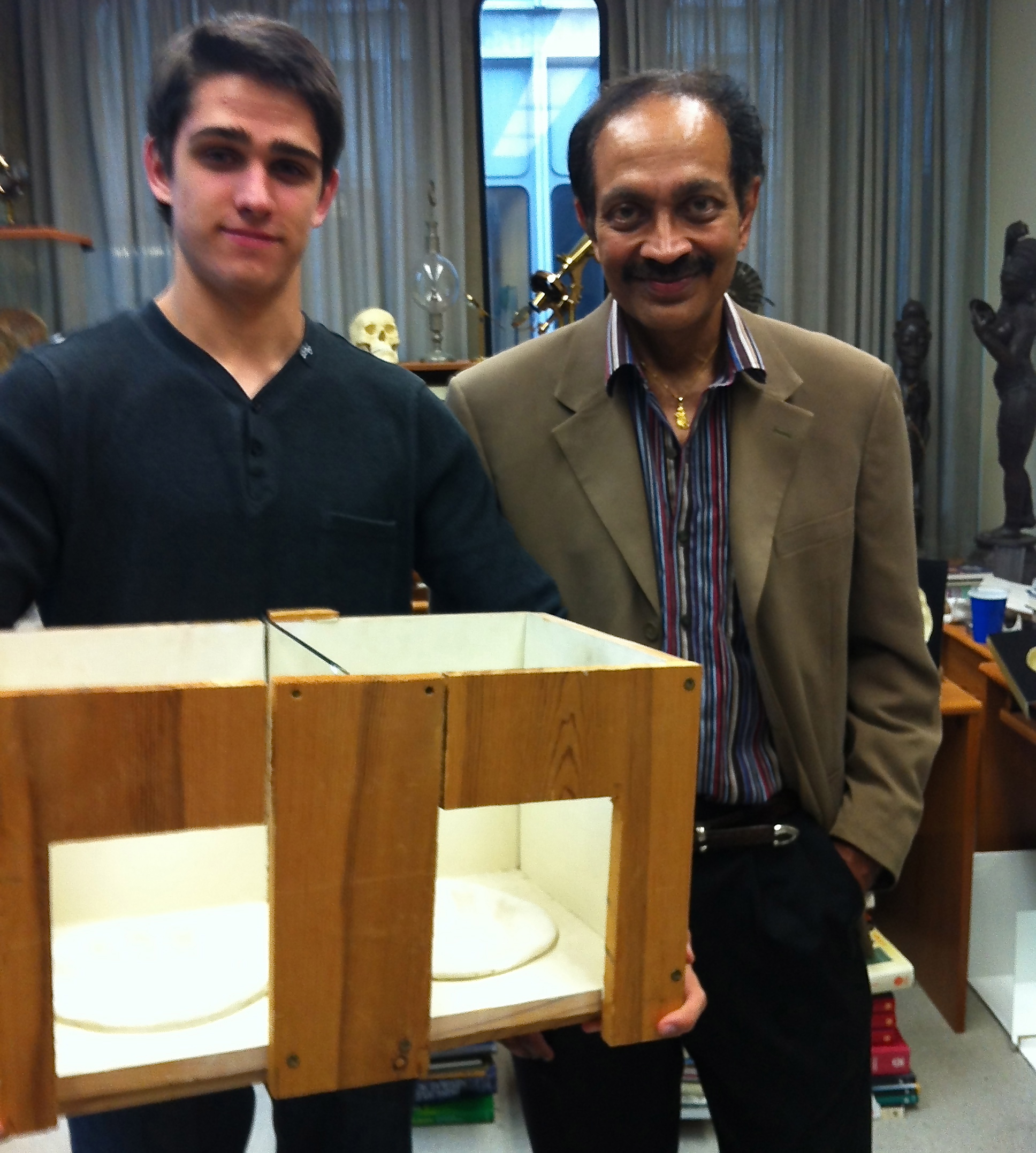
Ramachandran (right) with his original mirror box

A diagram of a mirror box. A patient inserts a whole hand into one hole and the "phantom" hand into the other. When viewed from an angle, an image of two complete hands is created in the brain.

Based on the observation that phantom limb patients were much more likely to report paralyzed and painful phantoms if the actual limb had been paralyzed prior to amputation (for example, due to a brachial plexus avulsion), Ramachandran and Rogers-Ramachandran proposed the "learned paralysis" hypothesis of painful phantom limbs. Their hypothesis was that every time the patient attempted to move the paralyzed limb, they received sensory feedback (through vision and proprioception) that the limb did not move. This feedback stamped itself into the brain circuitry through a process of Hebbian learning so that, even when the limb was no longer present, the brain had learned that the limb (and subsequent phantom) was paralyzed.

Ramachandran created the mirror box to relieve pain by helping an amputee imagine motor control over a missing limb. Mirror therapy is now also widely used for the treatment of motor disorders such as hemiplegia or cerebral palsy. As Deconick et al. state in a 2014 review, the mechanism of improved motor control and pain relief may differ from the mechanism of pain relief. Deconick et al., who reviewed only the effects of MVF on sensorimotor control, found that MVF can exert a strong influence on the motor network, mainly through increased cognitive penetration in action control.

Although there has been much research on MVF, authors of many review articles complain about the poor methodology often used, for example, small sample sizes or lack of control groups. For this reason, one 2016 review (based on a review of 8 studies) concluded that the level of evidence was insufficient to recommend MT as a first-line treatment for phantom limb pain.

A 2018 review (based on 15 studies conducted between 2012 and 2017 out of a pool of 115 publications) also criticized the quality of many reports on mirror therapy (MT) but concluded that "MT seems to be effective in relieving PLP, reducing the intensity and duration of daily pain episodes. It is a valid, simple, and inexpensive treatment for PLP."

A 2018 literature review of phantom limb pain stated that mirror therapy reduced pain in randomized controlled trials.

== Post-stroke hemiparesis ==
Treatment with mirror therapy soon expanded beyond its origin in treating phantom limb pain to treatment of other kinds of one-sided pain and loss of motor control, for example in stroke patients with hemiparesis. In 1999 Ramachandran and Eric Altschuler expanded the mirror technique from amputees to improving the muscle control of stroke patients with weakened limbs.

A review article published in 2016 concluded that "Mirror therapy (MT) is a valuable method for enhancing motor recovery in poststroke hemiparesis."

According to a 2017 review of fifteen studies that compared mirror therapy to conventional rehabilitation for the recovery of upper-limb function in stroke survivors, mirror therapy was more successful than CR in promoting recovery.

A 2018 review based on 1685 patients recovering from hemiplegic stroke found mirror therapy provided significant pain relief, while improving motor functions and activities of daily living (ADL).

Thirteen out of seventeen randomized controlled trials found that MT was beneficial for post-stroke patients' legs and feet, according to a 2019 review paper.

Despite considerable research, as of 2016 the underlying neural mechanisms of mirror therapy (MT) for stroke were still unclear. As Deconick et al. state in a 2014 review, the mechanism of improved motor control may differ from the mechanism of pain relief.

== Complex regional pain syndrome ==
Mirror therapy is also a recommended therapy for complex regional pain syndrome (CRPS).

== Virtual reality ==
Virtual reality and robotics can also provide the visual illusion of regaining control of a damaged limb, but with no advantages over standard mirror therapy.

== See also ==
- Neuropathic pain – Pain affecting the somatosensory nervous system
- Phantom eye syndrome
