= Phantom pain =

- Specialty: Neurology

Phantom pain is a painful perception that an individual experiences relating to a limb or an organ that is not physically part of the body, either because it was removed or was never there in the first place.

Sensations are reported most frequently following the amputation of a limb, but may also occur following the removal of a breast, tongue, or internal organ. Phantom eye syndrome can occur after eye loss. The pain sensation and its duration and frequency varies from individual to individual.

== Comparisons with related terms ==
Phantom pain should be distinguished from other conditions that may present similarly, such as phantom limb sensation and residual limb pain.

=== Phantom limb sensation ===
Phantom limb sensation is any sensory phenomenon, except pain, which is felt at an absent limb or a portion of the limb. It is estimated that up to 80% of amputees experience phantom limb sensations at some time of their lives. Some experience some level of this phantom feeling in the missing limb for the rest of their lives.

=== Residual limb pain ===
Residual limb pain, also referred to as stump pain, is a painful perception that originates from the residual limb, or stump, itself. It is typically a manifestation of an underlying source, such as surgical trauma, neuroma formation, infection, or an improperly fitted prosthetic device. Although these are different clinical conditions, individuals with phantom pain are more likely to concomitantly experience residual limb pain as well.

== Signs and symptoms ==
The symptomatic course of phantom pain is widely variable, but the onset often presents within the first week after amputation. The reported pain may be intermittent and lasting seconds to minutes, but can be continuous with acute exacerbations. The duration of symptoms varies among individuals, with some reporting decreased pain over time and others reporting a more stable or even increasing trajectory. Sensations may be described as shooting, stabbing, squeezing, throbbing, tingling, or burning, and sometimes feels as if the phantom part is being forced into an uncomfortable position.

Visual representation of body parts within the somatosensory cortex

While the sensation often affects the part of the limb farthest from the body, such as the fingers or toes, other body parts closer to the brain, such as the arm or leg, can still experience similar sensations. It is thought that phantom pain more commonly involves the part of the limb farthest from the body because of its larger cortical representation within the somatosensory cortex.

=== Triggers ===
Overall, the sensations may be triggered by pressure on the remaining part of the limb, emotional stress, or changes in temperature.

== Causes ==
Individuals may experience phantom pain following surgical or traumatic amputation of a limb, removal of an organ, or in instances of congenital limb deficiency. It is most commonly observed after amputation, although less frequent cases have been reported following the removal of a breast, tongue, or eye. Phantom pain is seen more often in older adults as compared to individuals with congenital limb deficiency or amputation at an early age. It has also been reported that individuals with a prior history of chronic pain, anxiety, or depression are more likely to develop phantom pain than those without these risk factors.

== Pathophysiology ==
The neurological basis and mechanisms for phantom pain are all derived from experimental theories and observations. Little is known about the true mechanisms causing phantom pain, and many theories highly overlap.

Historically, phantom pains were thought to originate from neuromas located at the stump tip. Traumatic neuromas, or non-tumor nerve injuries, often arise from surgeries and result from the abnormal growth of injured nerve fibers.

Although stump neuromas may contribute to phantom pains, they are not the sole cause. The reason is because patients with congenital limb deficiency can sometimes also experience phantom pains. This finding suggests that there is also a central mechanism responsible for generating painful sensations.

Currently, theories are based on altered neurological pathways and maladaptive changes within the peripheral nervous system, spinal cord, and brain.

=== Peripheral mechanisms ===
Neuromas formed from injured nerve endings at the stump site show increased sodium channel expression and are able to spontaneously fire abnormal action potentials. This increased activity of Aδ and C fibers, which are involved in pain and temperature sensation, can contribute to phantom pain. However, it has been noted that pain still persists once the neuromas have ceased firing action potentials or when peripheral nerves are treated with conduction blocking agents. The peripheral nervous system is therefore thought to have at most a modulation effect on phantom limb pain.

=== Spinal mechanisms ===
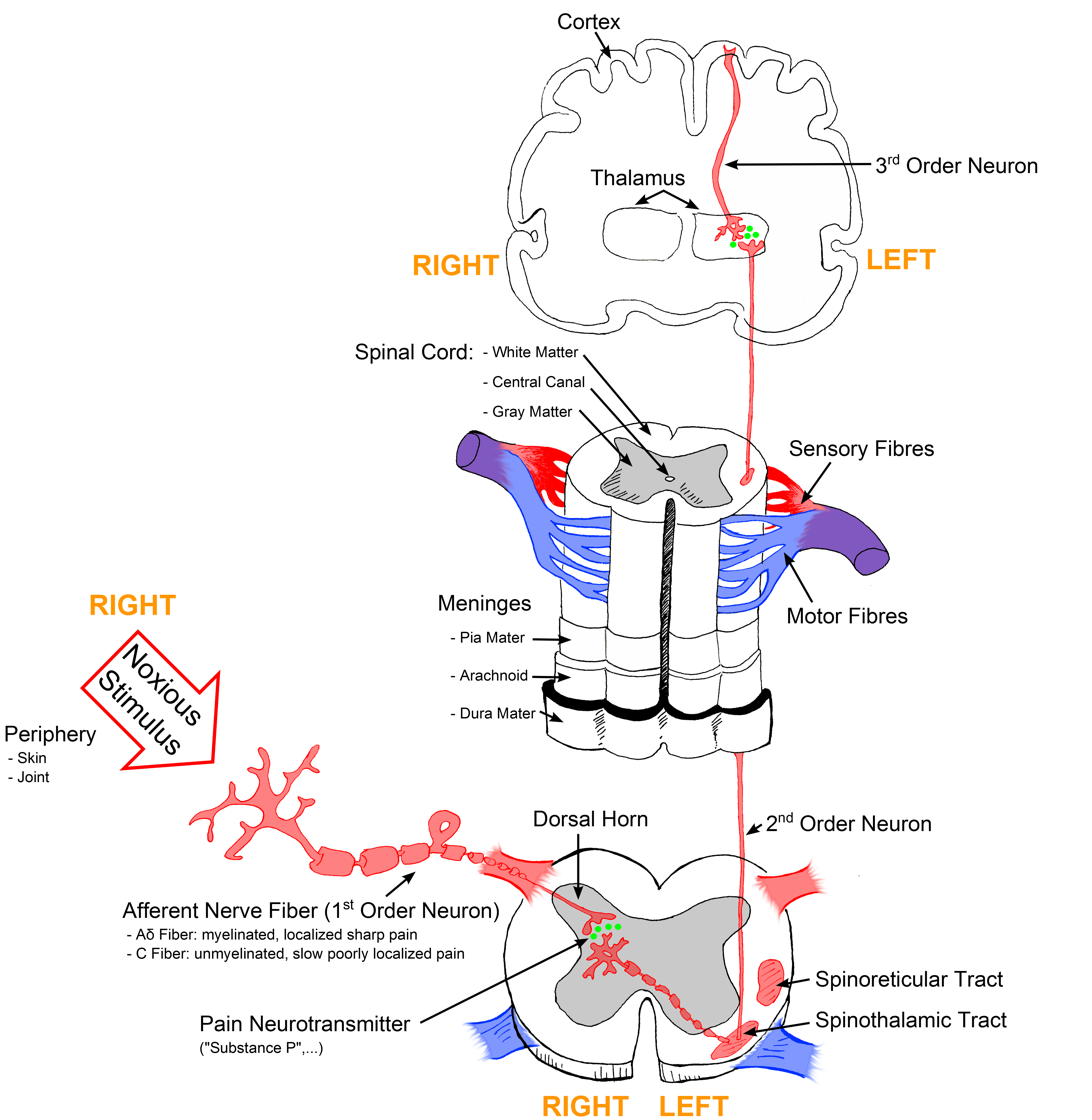
Schematic representation of the ascending pain pathways within the spinal cord

In addition to peripheral mechanisms, spinal mechanisms are thought to have an influencing role in the development of phantom pain. Peripheral nerve injury can lead to the degeneration of C fibers in the dorsal horn of the spinal cord, and terminating A fibers may subsequently branch into the same lamina. If this occurs, A fiber inputs could be reported as noxious stimuli. Substance P, involved in the transmission of pain signals, is usually expressed by Aδ and C fibers, but following peripheral nerve damage, substance P is expressed by Aβ fibers. This leads to hyperexcitability of the spinal cord, which usually occurs only in the presence of noxious stimuli. These changes to the nerve fiber inputs may also lead to an expansion of the neuronal receptive fields, such that previously non-noxious stimuli are now interpreted as noxious. This process of hyperexcitability and receptive field changes is broadly referred to as central sensitization. It is also known that increased expression of glutamate and NMDA, coupled with decreased inhibition from GABAergic neurons, further contributes to the mechanism of central sensitization. However, because patients with complete spinal cord injury have experienced phantom pain, there must also be an underlying central mechanism within the brain.

=== Central mechanisms ===
Under ordinary circumstances, the genetically determined circuitry in the brain remains largely stable throughout life. For much of the twentieth century, it was believed that no new neural circuits could be formed in the adult mammalian brain, but experiments from the 1980s onward cast this into doubt. For instance, functional MRI studies in amputees have shown that almost all patients have experienced cortical remapping. After amputation, cortical remapping is the process by which areas of the somatosensory and primary motor cortices representing the lost limb are invaded by nearby regions. This allows areas of the brain formerly receiving input from the lost limb to be stimulated from the nearby invading cortical regions.

Most of the studies using functional MRI to investigate cortical remapping in humans have been in upper limb amputees. Following the loss of an arm, the majority of motor reorganization occurred as a downward shift of the hand area of the cortex onto the area of face representation, especially the lips. In individuals with phantom limb pain, the reorganization was great enough to cause a change in cortical lip representation into the hand areas only during lip movements. Additionally, as phantom pains in upper extremity amputees increased, there was a higher degree of medial shift of the facial motor representation. It has also been found that there is a high correlation between the severity of phantom limb pain and the extent to which cortical reorganization has occurred.

==== The neuromatrix ====
The neuromatrix theory, initially coined by psychologist Ronald Melzack in the 1990s, proposes that there is an extensive network connecting the thalamus and the cortex, and the cortex and the limbic system. It extends beyond body schema theory and proposes that conscious awareness and the perception of self are generated in the brain via patterns of input that can be modified by different perceptual inputs. The network is genetically predetermined, and is modified throughout one's lifetime by various sensory inputs to create a neurosignature. It is the neurosignature of a specific body part that determines how it is consciously perceived. The input systems contributing to the neurosignature are primarily the somatosensory, limbic, and thalamocortical systems. The neuromatrix theory aims to explain how certain activities associated with pain lead to the conscious perception of phantom pain. After limb amputation, changes to the neuromatrix and neurosignature may be the cause of phantom pain localized to the lost limb. Phantom pain may also arise from abnormal reorganization in the neuromatrix to a pre-existing pain state.

Support for the neuromatrix theory is largely from studies where cordotomy, and therefore elimination of pain signals transmitted to the brain, fail to treat phantom pains. Opposition to the theory exists largely because it fails to explain why relief from phantom sensations rarely eliminates phantom pains. It also does not address how sensations can spontaneously end and how some amputees do not experience phantom sensations at all. In addition, a major limitation of the neuromatrix theory is that it is difficult to be tested empirically, especially when testing painless phantom sensations.

== Diagnosis ==
Phantom pain is a clinical diagnosis based on the signs and symptoms an individual describes. There are no specific laboratory studies or imaging findings that support its diagnosis. However, it is important for a doctor to perform a thorough physical examination to assess for other potential causes of pain. Evaluation of the residual limb should be done to inspect for signs of infection, bursa or pressure ulcer formation, or deep tissue injury. If an individual has a prosthesis, evaluation of fit and alignment should also be performed. A thorough neurological and musculoskeletal examination should be conducted, including assessment of strength, range of motion, and reflexes, to rule out any other central or peripheral causes for the pain.

== Management ==
Various methods have been used to treat phantom limb pain. There are currently no specific management guidelines or stepwise approaches to therapy. Instead, treatment involves a multimodal approach with a variety of available interventions. Doctors may prescribe medications, and some antidepressants or antiepileptics have been shown to have a beneficial effect on reducing phantom limb pain. Physical methods such as light massage, electrical stimulation, and hot and cold therapy have been used with variable results.

There are many different treatment options for phantom limb pain that are actively being researched. Most treatments do not take into account the mechanisms underlying phantom pains, and are therefore difficult to investigate. However, there are a few treatment options that have been shown to alleviate pain in some patients, but these treatment options usually have a success rate of less than 30%. This rate of success does not exceed the placebo effect.

=== Medication ===
Pharmacological techniques are often initiated alone or in conjunction with other treatment options. Doses of pain medications needed often drop substantially when combined with other techniques, but rarely are discontinued completely. The use of antiepileptics, such as gabapentin, pregabalin, and topiramate, has shown mixed results in clinical studies. However, there are currently no high-quality randomized trials supporting the efficacy of these medications. Tricyclic antidepressants, such as amitriptyline, are often used to relieve chronic pain, and recently have been used in an attempt to reduce phantom pains. Recent studies using amitriptyline have also failed to provide conclusive, non-conflicting results. N-methyl-D-aspartate (NMDA) receptor antagonists, such as ketamine, are thought to work by reversing the process of central sensitization within the spinal cord, which has been proposed as a possible mechanism for the development of phantom pain. The use of ketamine has shown to reduce phantom pain, but memantine, a medication within the same drug class, did not provide any benefit to patients. Pain relief may also be achieved through use of opioids, calcitonin, and lidocaine.

=== Mirror therapy ===
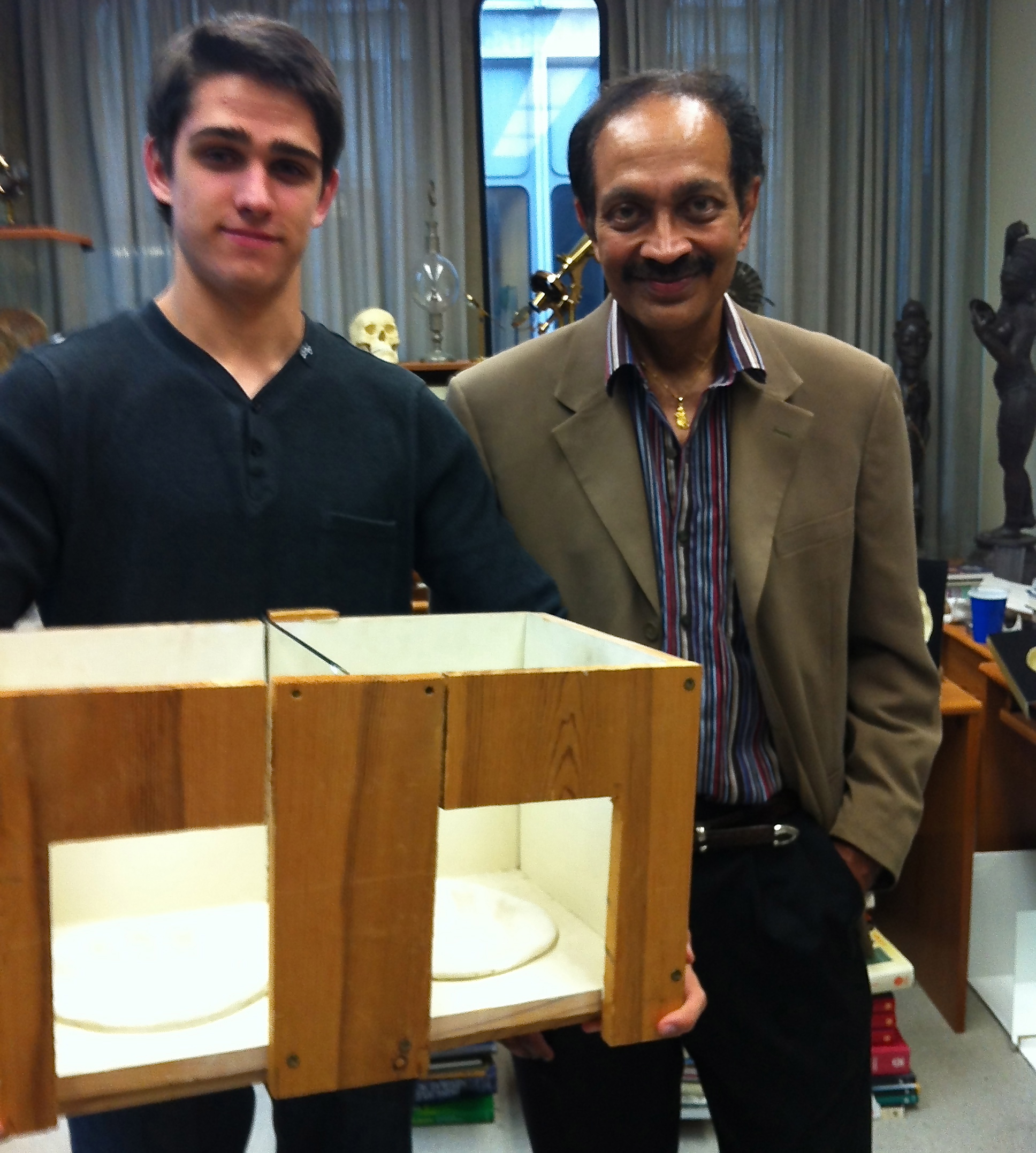
Ramachandran (right) with his original mirror box

Mirror box therapy is a simple and inexpensive therapy for phantom pain that was first invented in the 1990s by neuroscientist Vilayanur S. Ramachandran. Individuals place their intact limb in front of the mirror and voluntarily move the limb, giving them the visual that their absent limb is also moving. It allows for illusions of movement and touch in a phantom limb by inducing somatosensory and motor pathway coupling between the phantom and real limb. Many patients experience pain as a result of a clenched phantom limb, and because phantom limbs are not under voluntary control, unclenching becomes impossible. This theory proposes that the phantom limb feels paralyzed because there is no feedback from the phantom back to the brain to inform it otherwise. Ramachandran believes that if the brain received visual feedback that the phantom limb had moved, then the phantom limb would become unparalyzed.

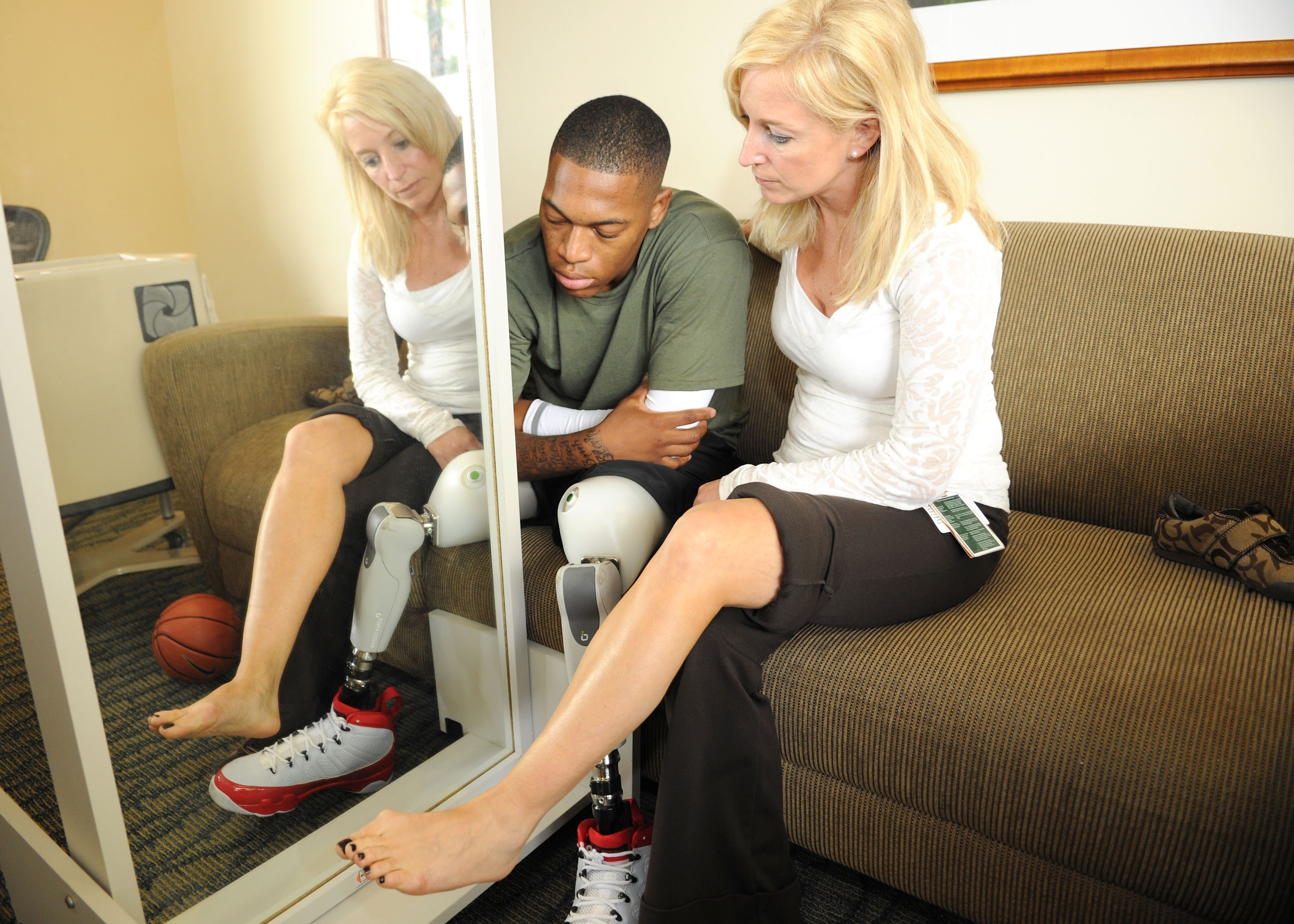
Lower limb amputee using mirror box therapy to address phantom pain

Although the use of mirror therapy has been shown to be effective in some cases, there is still no widely accepted theory of how it works. According to a 2017 paper that reviewed a wide range of studies using mirror therapy, patients may experience reduced phantom pains after four weeks of treatment. The study goes on to say that while the exact mechanism of mirror therapy isn't completely understood, it is a safe and inexpensive option for patients to consider.

Little research was published on mirror therapy before 2009, and much of the research since then has been of low quality. Out of 115 publications between 2012 and 2017 that investigated the use of mirror therapy for phantom pain, a 2018 review found only 15 studies whose scientific results should be considered. From these 15 studies, the reviewers concluded that mirror therapy is an effective tool to reduce both the duration and intensity of phantom pain.

Current theories on how mirror therapy may reduce phantom pain have largely come from studies investigating changes in the brain using functional MRI. There is evidence to show a reduction and reversal of cortical reorganization within the somatosensory cortex following mirror therapy. Since maladaptive changes within cortical regions of the brain are proposed to be a central mechanism of phantom pain, a reversal of this remapping is thought to alleviate pain.

=== Graded motor imagery ===
Graded motor imagery was initially developed to help patients suffering from complex regional pain syndrome, but has since expanded to other chronic pain conditions, including phantom pain. The treatment is thought to work in a similar fashion as mirror box therapy, where maladaptive cortical reorganization is reversed and there is no longer a functional connection between movement and pain. A recent systematic review and meta-analysis provided support for the use of graded motor imagery to help reduce the severity of phantom pain in amputees.

=== Motor execution with biofeedback ===
Phantom motor execution with biofeedback is a newer therapeutic intervention that takes advantage of augmented and virtual reality. During these sessions, patients wear virtual reality goggles that allow them to visualize their phantom limb as a normal, intact limb. They are then able to participate in different interactive games, such as reaching for and grasping objects. It is theorized that by doing so, there becomes a 'match' between the visual and somatosensory systems, which may lead to decreased phantom pain. Importantly, as opposed to conventional mirror box therapy, the ability to interact with virtual reality games may increase patients' participation and result in improved outcomes. Numerous case reports and case series have shown promising results, but a more robust analysis is likely needed to substantiate these claims.

=== Deep brain stimulation ===
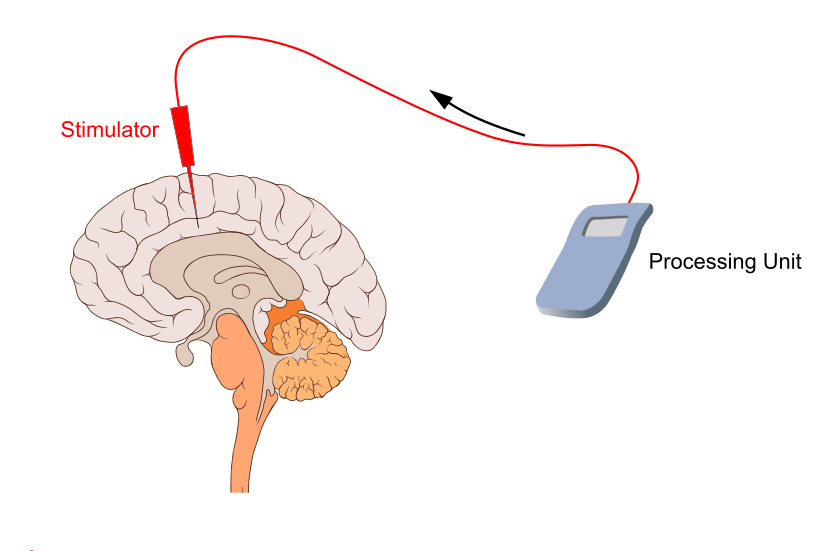
Deep brain stimulation for the management of phantom pain

Deep brain stimulation is a surgical technique used to alleviate patients from phantom limb pain. It is typically reserved for refractory cases or when all other therapeutic interventions have not provided relief. Prior to surgery, patients undergo functional brain imaging techniques such as PET scans and functional MRI to determine an appropriate trajectory of where pain is originating. Surgery is then carried out under local anesthetic, because patient feedback during the operation is needed. In the study conducted by Bittar et al., a radiofrequency electrode with four contact points was placed on the brain. Once the electrode was in place, the contact locations were altered slightly according to where the patient felt the greatest relief from pain. Once the location of maximal relief was determined, the electrode was implanted and secured to the skull. After the primary surgery, a secondary surgery under general anesthesia was conducted. A subcutaneous pulse generator was implanted into a pectoral pocket below the clavicle to stimulate the electrode. It was found that all three patients studied had gained satisfactory pain relief from the deep brain stimulation. Pain had not been completely eliminated, but the intensity had been reduced by over 50% and the burning component had completely vanished. Additional studies have corroborated these findings, though more rigorous interventional trials are needed to better elucidate the safety and efficacy of this procedure. A recent systematic review found mixed results, also suggesting the need for additional randomized, controlled studies.

== Epidemiology ==
It is estimated that the reported prevalence of phantom pain may be as high as 80% among amputees. It is more commonly observed in the adult population, with less common occurrences seen among individuals with amputations at an early age or in those with congenital limb deficiency. Gender, side of limb loss, and etiology of amputation have not been shown to affect the onset of phantom limb pain. One investigation of lower limb amputation observed that as stump length decreased, and therefore length of the phantom limb increased, there was a greater incidence of moderate and severe phantom pain. It has also been reported that individuals with bilateral amputations, especially in the lower limbs, experience phantom pain more commonly.

More than half the people that experience phantom pain would also experience residual limb pain.

== History ==
The term "phantom limb" was first coined by American neurologist Silas Weir Mitchell in 1871. Mitchell described that "thousands of spirit limbs were haunting as many good soldiers, every now and then tormenting them". However, in 1551, French military surgeon Ambroise Paré recorded the first documentation of phantom limb pain when he reported that "the patients, long after the amputation is made, say that they still feel pain in the amputated part".

== See also ==
- Phantom limb
- Phantom eye syndrome
