= Body transfer illusion =

Illusion of owning either a part of a body or an entire body other than one's own

Body transfer illusion is the illusion of owning either a part of a body or an entire body other than one's own, thus it is sometimes referred to as "body ownership" in the research literature. It can be induced experimentally by manipulating the visual perspective of the subject and also supplying visual and sensory signals which correlate to the subject's body. For it to occur, bottom-up perceptual mechanisms, such as the input of visual information, must override top-down knowledge that the certain body (or part) does not belong. This is what results in an illusion of transfer of body ownership. It is typically induced using virtual reality.

== Rubber hand illusion ==
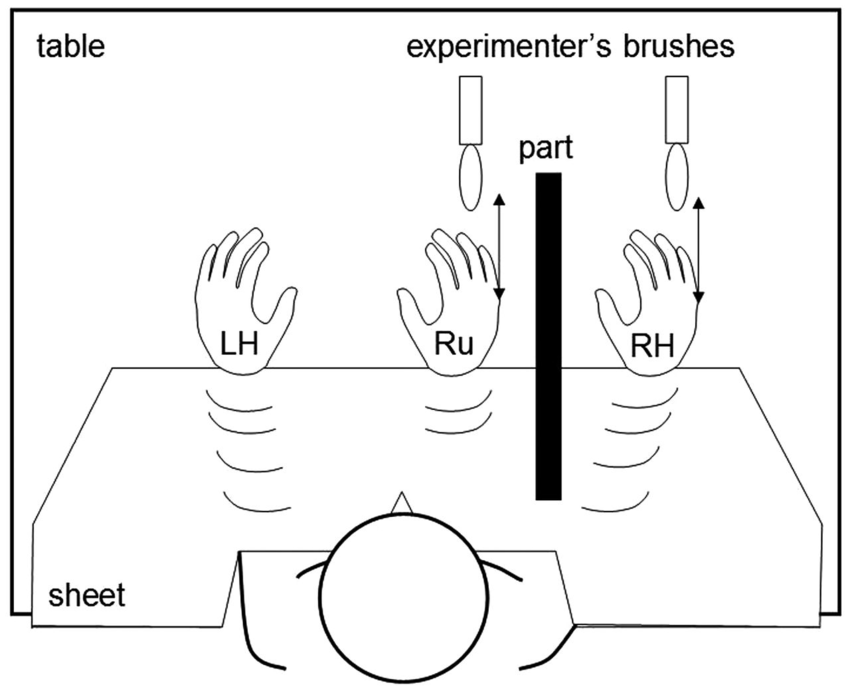
Schematic diagram of an experimental set-up in the rubber hand illusion task. LH = left hand; part = partition; RH = right hand; Ru = rubber hand.

The rubber hand illusion was originally reported by Botvinick and Cohen in 1998. A 2004 study repeated the experiment. Subjects with normal brain function were positioned with their left hand hidden out of sight. They saw a lifelike rubber left hand in front of them. The experimenters stroked both the subjects hidden left hand and the visible rubber hand with a paintbrush. The experiment showed that if the two hands were stroked synchronously and in the same direction, the subjects began to experience the rubber hand as their own. When asked to use their right hand to point to their left hand, most of the time they pointed toward the rubber hand. If the real and rubber hands were stroked in different directions or at different times, the subjects did not experience the rubber hand as their own.

While the experiment was happening, the experimenters also recorded the activity of their brains with a functional MRI scanner. The scans showed increased activity in the parietal lobe and then, right after, as the subjects began to experience the rubber hand as their own, in the premotor cortex, the region of the brain involved in planning movements. On the other hand, when the stroking of the real and rubber hands was uncoordinated and the subjects did not experience the rubber hand as their own, the premotor cortex did not become activated. From this the experimenters concluded that the parietal cortex was involved with visual and touch processing. The premotor cortex, getting transmitted information from the parietal cortex, was involved with the feeling of ownership of the rubber hand.

Another study from the same laboratory provided further evidence of this ownership of the rubber hand. The experimenters used the same procedure as the previous experiment to establish that feeling of ownership involved with the stimulation of the premotor cortex. Then, threatened the rubber hand by making a stabbing movement toward it with a needle (not actually making contact with the rubber hand). MRI scans showed increase activity in a region of the brain called the anterior cingulate cortex that is normally activated when a person anticipates pain, along with the supplementary motor area, that is normally activated when a person feels the urge to move his or her arm. The anticipation of the needle made the subjects react as if the rubber hand was their own, moving their real hand to avoid the needle even though it was never actually in danger.

The rubber hand illusion can be induced in rhesus monkeys as shown by their self-directed movements being displaced towards the position of the fake hand.

== Illusion induced through virtual reality ==
One of the ways in which body transfer illusion has been studied is through virtual reality simulation where a first person perspective of a life-sized virtual human female body has appeared to substitute the male subjects' own body. This was demonstrated subjectively by questionnaire and physiologically through heart-rate deceleration in response to a threat to the virtual body. The results support the notion that bottom-up perceptual mechanisms, such as those involving the premotor cortex and cerebellum, can temporarily override top down knowledge therefore resulting in a radical illusion of transfer of body ownership. In the study, male participants entered the virtual reality simulation and experienced various forms of stimulation including arm-stroking and other physical sensations. Afterwards the heart rate was monitored and a questionnaire was completed.

== Applications ==
Body transfer illusion has been used in order to treat the experience of phantom limb pain by giving visual feedback of the missing limb. The mirror box gives visual feedback that can allow a person using it the opportunity to "see" the missing hand, and to manipulate the hand in an attempt to relieve pain or discomfort. Virtual reality is also used to treat phantom limb pain in a similar way, by allowing the user to "see" the missing limb within the virtual world and manipulate it however they choose.

== Neural basis ==
The integration of touch stimulation via the somatosensory system with visual input is essential for creating the body transfer illusion. When the body is not in motion, it perceives its position in space through the integration of multi-modal afferent signals. Motion of the body adds efferent signal information and leads to a more fluid perception of body transfer. When information from one form of signal (e.g. touch) does not match the signals from another sense (e.g. vision), the body still attempts to integrate this information. Specifically the rubber hand illusion is associated with activity in the multisensory areas, most notably the ventral premotor cortex. However, it remains to be demonstrated that this illusion does not simply reflect the dominant role of vision and that the premotor activity does not reflect a visual representation of an object near the hand.

== Drug-induced enhancement ==
With ketamine, the body transfer illusion is ultimately enhanced and participants are more vulnerable to a false sense of limb ownership than without the use of ketamine. Although the precise nature of ketamine's impact is speculative, two features of its effects are noteworthy. First, it promotes an overall increase in the subjective and behavioral indices of the illusion. Second, this effect is found even when a sensory asynchrony is present, a manipulation that would normally reduce the experience of the illusion. This pattern may be understood in terms of the drug's impact on the top-down–bottom-up balance that would normally account for the illusion's characteristic features since ketamine produces an overall increase in tendency to the illusion, whereas this sensitivity to the coherence of visual and tactile input is preserved. A further possibility is that ketamine enhances the salience of the visual input (the sight of a rubber hand in a position compatible with one's own hand) at the expense of information arising from the temporal asynchrony between sensory inputs. This would explain why the presence of the rubber hand is enough to enable the illusion to persist, even when in attenuated form, when visuo-tactile inputs are asynchronous.

A very similar effect occurs with the administration of the dopamine and noradrenaline releasing agent dextroamphetamine. The similarities include increased subjective reports of embodiment of the rubber hand during the illusion, and that the dextroamphetamine enhancing effect is also seen during sensory asynchrony.

== Mind-body connection ==
Human bodily experience is characterized by the immediate and continuous experience that our body and its parts belong to us, often called self-attribution, body ownership and or mineness. It is unknown if the origin of body representation is innate or if it is constructed from sensory experience. A related, but distinct, bodily experience is self-localization or embodiment that is defined as the experience that the self is localized at the position of our body at a certain position in space. Recent philosophical and neurological theories converge on the relevance of such bodily experiences and associated processing of bodily information as one promising approach for the development of a comprehensive neurobiological model of self-consciousness. Yet, the scientific investigation of bodily experiences in general, and self-attribution/body ownership and self-localization/embodiment more specifically, have proven difficult and have not received the attention they deserve given their importance for neuroscientific models of self and self-consciousness.

== Doubts about suggestion effects ==
In 2019, Lush et al., reported correlations between response to the rubber hand illusion and both response to imaginative suggestions in hypnosis and participant expectations for illusion experience and argued that body transfer illusions may be suggestion effects generated by participants' expectations. In 2020, Lush reported that demand characteristics (contextual cues which prime participant expectations) have not been controlled in rubber hand illusion experiments, and argued that existing reports of body transfer illusions may be entirely accounted for by suggestion effects. In 2022, Slater and Ehrsson argued that Lush's claims were not supported by the data and that the major factor driving the rubber hand illusion is multisensory integration.

== See also ==
- Body schema § Associated disorders
