= Phantom eye syndrome =

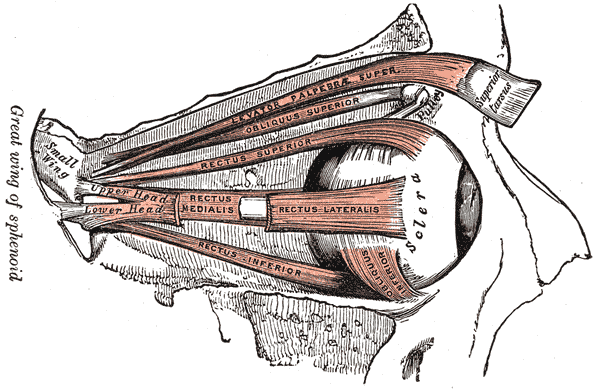
- Anatomy of the eye. The external eye muscles are shown in red.
- Specialty: Psychiatry, Neurology
- Duration: 11-15 days
- Frequency: 5%

Phantom eye syndrome (PES) is a phantom pain in the eye and visual hallucinations after the removal of an eye (enucleation, evisceration).

== Symptoms and signs ==
Many patients experience one or more phantom phenomena after the removal of the eye:

- Phantom pain in the (removed) eye (prevalence: 26%)
- Non-painful phantom sensations
- Visual hallucinations. About 30% of patients report visual hallucinations of the removed eye. Most of these hallucinations consist of basic perceptions (shapes, colors). In contrast, visual hallucinations caused by severe visual loss without removal of the eye itself (Charles Bonnet syndrome) are less frequent (prevalence 10%) and often consist of detailed images.

== Pathogenesis ==
=== Causes ===
Triggers of Phantom Eye Syndrome encompass a range of factors that can initiate or intensify phantom sensations and pain following eye removal. These triggers commonly include fatigue, stress, and fluctuations in lighting conditions. Some cases suggest a correlation between the duration of pain prior to eye removal and the presence of preoperative conditions, such as headache or eye pain, with the likelihood of experiencing subsequent phantom sensations.

=== Phantom pain and non-painful phantom sensations ===
Phantom sensations in Phantom Eye Syndrome (PES) encompass various tactile perceptions such as paresthesia, dysesthesia, and hyperpathia, excluding pain. These sensations can manifest in different forms, including kinetic, kinesthetic, or exteroceptive perceptions, and are commonly experienced by almost all PES patients. Some cases have highlighted the prevalence of Phantom Eye Pain (PEP) in PES, with rates as high as 47% reported. PEP includes pain felt around the amputated eye (periocular pain), contributing to a higher prevalence compared to studies defining PEP solely as pain in the amputated eye. Frequency and characteristics of PEP vary, with paroxysmal episodes lasting for a few seconds or minutes being common, and weather conditions such as cold and humid weather serving as major triggering factors. Furthermore, approximately 38% of PES patients may experience neuropathic pain, indicating a need for targeted medication approaches.

Phantom pain and non-painful phantom sensations result from changes in the central nervous system due to denervation of a body part. Phantom eye pain is considerably less common than phantom limb pain. The prevalence of phantom pain after limb amputation ranged from 50% to 78%. The prevalence of phantom eye pain, in contrast, is about 30%.

Post-amputation changes in the cortical representation of body parts adjacent to the amputated limb are believed to contribute to the development of phantom pain and non-painful phantom sensations. One reason for the smaller number of patients with phantom eye pain compared with those with phantom limb pain may be the smaller cortical somatosensory representation of the eye compared with the limbs.

In limb amputees, some, but not all, studies have found a correlation between preoperative pain in the affected limb and postoperative phantom pain. There is a significant association between painful and non-painful phantom experiences, preoperative pain in the symptomatic eye and headache. Based on the present data, it is difficult to determine if headaches or preoperative eye pain play a causal role in the development of phantom phenomena or if headache, preoperative eye pain, and postoperative phantom eye experiences are only epiphenomena of an underlying factor. However, a study in humans demonstrated that experimental pain leads to a rapid reorganization of the somatosensory cortex. This study suggests that preoperative and postoperative pain may be an important co-factor for somatosensory reorganization and the development of phantom experiences.

=== Visual hallucinations ===
Individuals with Phantom Eye Syndrome (PES) may experience phantom visual sensations (PVS), which involve perceiving images that are not actually present in the removed eye. These hallucinations often resemble real-world objects, ranging from people and animals to various structures and scenes. Visual hallucinations in PES can be categorized into elementary, consisting of simple visual phenomena without distinct meaning, and complex, involving more detailed and formed perceptions that may relate to past experiences. Rates of PVS range from 30% to 48% in eye amputated patients with the episodic nature of hallucinations persisting for at least 2 years post-surgery.

Enucleation of an eye and, similarly, retinal damage, leads to a cascade of events in the cortical areas receiving visual input. Cortical GABAergic (GABA: Gamma-aminobutyric acid) inhibition decreases, and cortical glutamatergic excitation increases, followed by increased visual excitability or even spontaneous activity in the visual cortex. It is believed that spontaneous activity in the denervated visual cortex is the neural correlate of visual hallucinations.

=== Quality of life and psychological support ===
Anxiety often accompanies phantom eye symptoms (PES) in patients undergoing enucleation for uveal melanoma. While the exact nature of this relationship is complex, studies suggest that elevated anxiety levels may precede the onset of PES, particularly phantom eye pain (PEP). However, it's important to note that anxiety does not appear to influence the persistence of PES over time. Understanding and addressing anxiety in these patients may help alleviate distress associated with PES and improve overall well-being during the post-operative period. Moreover, eye removal can have more broad psychological impacts including insecurity, rejection, and fear of social marginalization. Ocular prosthesis can aid in restoring aesthetics and promoting psychological well-being. Psychological support, alongside medical intervention, is essential for managing anxiety and depression in PES patients.

== Treatment ==
Treatment on painful phantom eye syndrome is limited and does not point out a standard treatment protocol but possible treatment pathways include resting techniques, pharmacologic, non-pharmacologic, surgery, drug therapy, and psychological. Individualized treatment strategies that combine various treatment pathways is potentially the treatment method. Triggers for phantom eye syndrome are generally related to stressors such as fatigue, extreme lighting conditions (dark or bright), opening and closing the eyes, and psychological stress. Resting techniques such as sleeping, using artificial tears, and closing eyes for extended periods of time have been proven to reduced negative symptoms associated with phantom eye syndrome such as phantom eye pain (PEP), phantom visions, and/or phantom sensations. Pharmacologic techniques used for treating PEP depend on the pain level. Low pain can be treated through paracetamol and non-steroidal anti-inflammatory medications; medium level pain can be treated with tramadol or codeine; and high level pain can be treated with morphine. Possible drug therapy treatments for phantom eye syndrome can incorporate antidepressants, anticonvulsants, sodium channel blockers, N-methyl-D-aspartate receptor antagonists, and opioids. Possible psychological treatment techniques include cognitive-behavioral therapy (trauma-focused or reprocessing), reassurance therapy (specifically in the case of hallucinations), and mind-body therapies (enhancing self-awareness and self-regulation of symptoms).

In the instance of introducing a ocular prosthesis (glass eye), it is important that the procedure prioritizes proper fitting of the ocular prosthesis, transparency with the patient, and meticulous monitoring of emotional state preceding and following insertion. Ocular prothesis can mitigate symptoms of physiological distress related to phantom eye syndrome through simulating the functions of a normal eye socket.

Overall, the literature promotes treatment that focuses on increasing quality of life through addressing personalized emotional and physical phantom eye syndrome stressors.

== See also ==
- Visual system
- Charles Bonnet syndrome
- Phantom limb
