= Complex regional pain syndrome =

Array of painful conditions in humans

- Other names: Algodystrophy, reflex neurovascular dystrophy
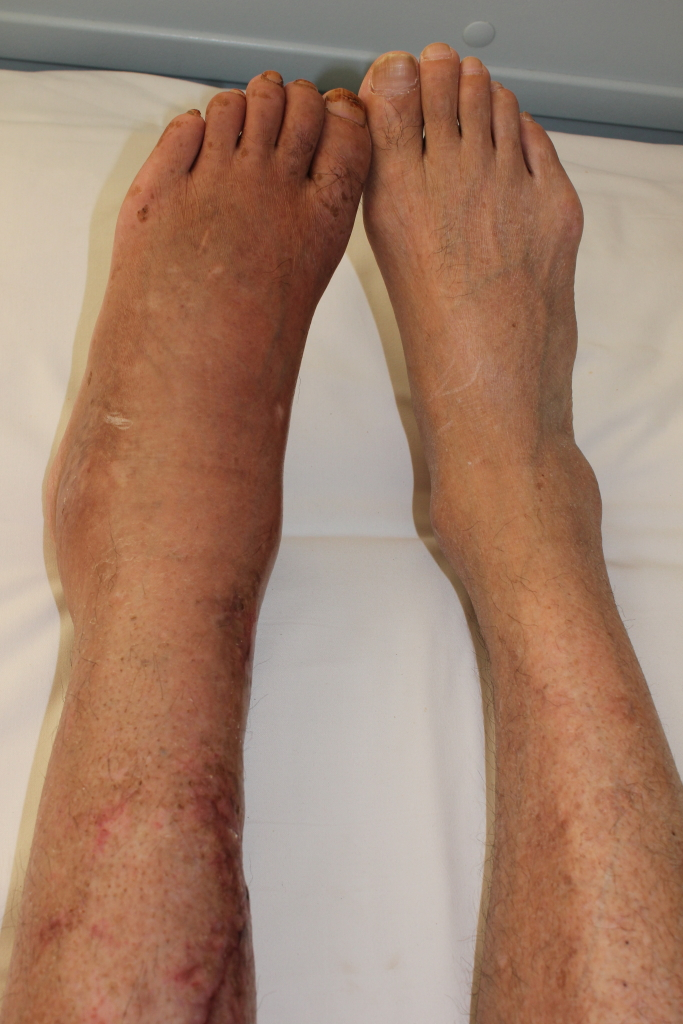
- Leg of an individual (left) with complex regional pain syndrome following a tibial fracture
- Specialty: Neurology, psychiatry, physiatry, anesthesiology
- Symptoms: Pain, hyperalgesia, allodynia, hypoesthesia or hyperesthesia, skin abnormalities, atrophy, stiffness, temperature asymmetry
- Types: CRPS-1 (previously, reflex sympathetic dystrophy [RSD]); CRPS-2 (previously, causalgia)
- Treatment: Physical therapy (more effective with early diagnosis); medications (e.g., anticonvulsants, opioids, muscle relaxants); spinal cord stimulator; peripheral nerve stimulator implantation; sympathetic nerve blockade; ketamine infusion; lidocaine infusion; implantable pharmaceuticals; amputation
- Medication: Anticonvulsants (e.g., gabapentin); muscle relaxants (e.g., baclofen), ketamine or lidocaine infusions

Complex regional pain syndrome (CRPS), sometimes referred to by the hyponyms reflex sympathetic dystrophy (RSD) or reflex neurovascular dystrophy (RND) (type 1) or causalgia (type 2), is a rare and severe form of neuroinflammatory and dysautonomic disorder causing chronic pain, neurovascular, and neuropathic symptoms. Although it can vary widely, the classic presentation occurs when severe pain from a physical trauma or neurotropic viral infection outlasts the expected recovery time, and may subsequently spread to uninjured areas. The symptoms of types 1 and 2 are the same, except type 2 is associated with nerve injury.

Usually starting in a single limb, CRPS often first manifests as pain, swelling, limited range of motion or partial paralysis, or changes to the skin and bones. It may initially affect one limb and then spread throughout the body; 35% of affected individuals report symptoms throughout the body. Two types are thought to exist: CRPS type 1 (previously referred to as reflex sympathetic dystrophy) and CRPS type 2 (previously referred to as causalgia). It is possible to have both types.

Amplified musculoskeletal pain syndrome, a condition that is similar to CRPS, primarily affects pediatric patients, falls under rheumatology and pediatrics, and is generally considered a subset of CRPS type 1.

== Classification ==
The classification system in use by the International Association for the Study of Pain (IASP) divides CRPS into two types based on the presence or absence of measurable nerve pathophysiology.

International Association for the Study of Pain Classification
| Type | Clinical findings | Synonyms |
|---|---|---|
| Type I | CRPS without evidence of neuropathology in the affected limb. This accounts for about 90% of CRPS. | reflex sympathetic dystrophy, RSD, Sudeck's atrophy |
| Type II | CRPS with evidence of neuropathology in the affected limb. | causalgia |

== Signs and symptoms ==
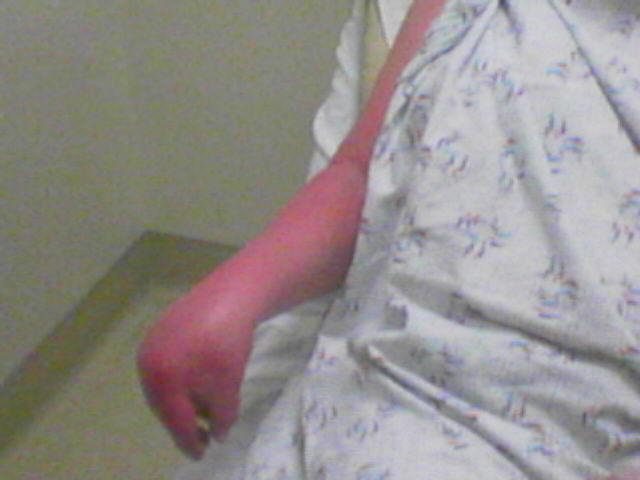
Severe CRPS of right arm

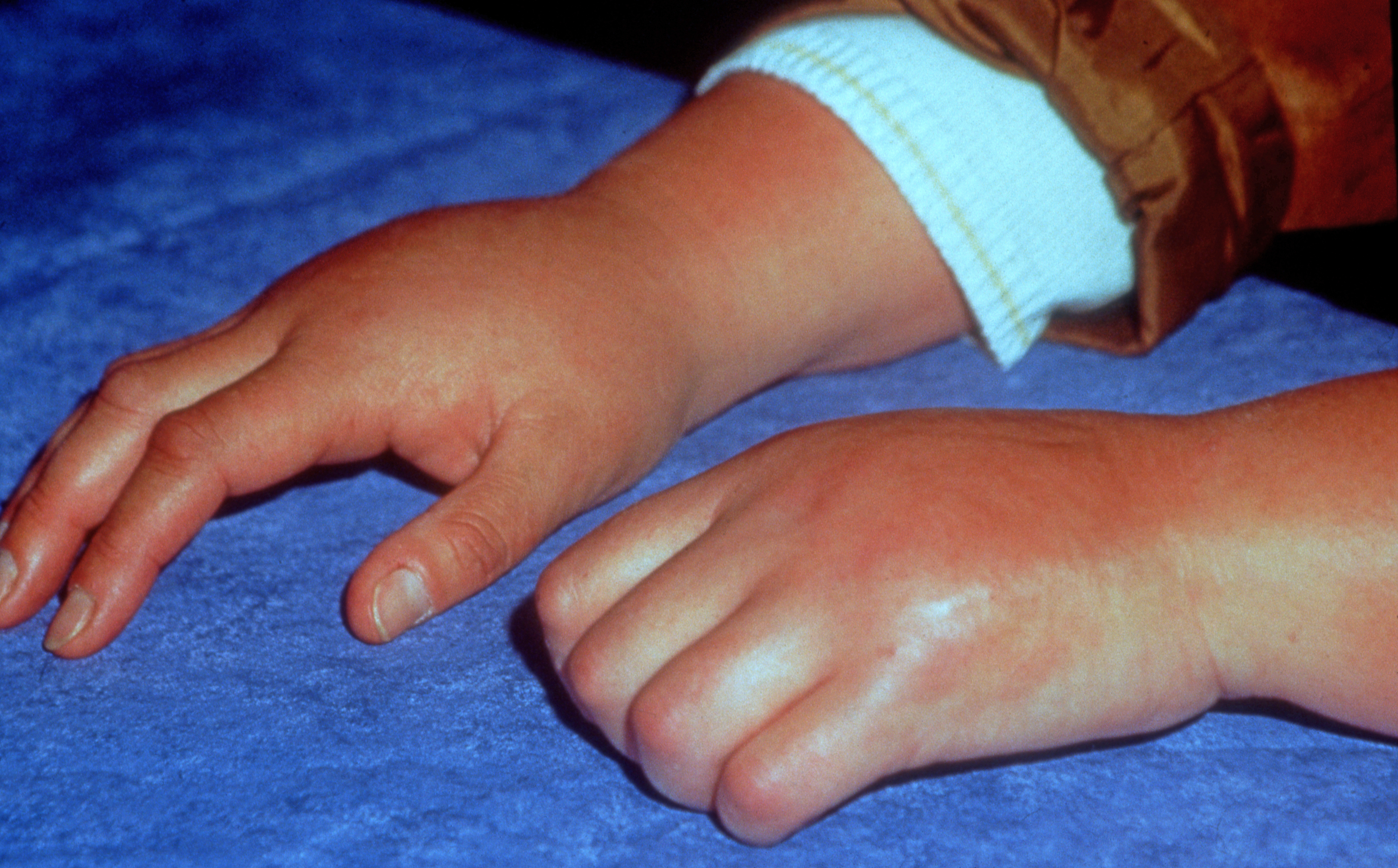
CRPS visible on hands and wrists

Clinical features of CRPS have been found to be inflammation resulting from the release of certain pro-inflammatory chemical signals from surrounding nerve cells; hypersensitization of pain receptors; dysfunction of local vasoconstriction and vasodilation; and maladaptive neuroplasticity.

The signs and symptoms of CRPS usually manifest near the injury site. The most common symptoms are extreme pain, including burning, stabbing, grinding, and throbbing. The pain is out of proportion to the severity of the initial injury. Moving or touching the limb is disproportionately painful (allodynia). Other findings are aspects of disuse including swelling, stiffness (limited range of motion), and disuse related changes to the skin (temperature, color, sweating, texture) and bones (disuse osteoporosis).

A prior concept of CRPS having three stages is no longer in wide use. The trend is now to consider distinct sub-types of CRPS.

== Cause ==
Complex regional pain syndrome is uncommon, and its cause is unclear. CRPS typically develops after an injury, surgery, heart attack, or stroke. Investigators estimate that 2–5% of those with peripheral nerve injury, and 13–70% of those with hemiplegia (paralysis of one side of the body) will develop CRPS. In addition, some studies have indicated that tobacco smoking is more often present in CRPS patients. Smoking may be involved in its pathophysiology among tobacco users by enhancing sympathetic activity, vasoconstriction, or other unknown neurotransmitter-related mechanism. This hypothesis was based on a small 1993 retrospective analysis of 53 patients with RSD, which showed that 68% of patients were smokers, compared to only 37% of the control population. The results are preliminary and are limited by their retrospective nature. A minority (7%) of individuals with CRPS in a single limb go on to develop it in another.

== Pathophysiology ==
Inflammation and alteration of pain perception in the central nervous system are proposed to play important roles. The persistent pain and the perception of nonpainful stimuli as painful are thought to be caused by inflammatory molecules (IL-1, IL-2, TNF-alpha) and neuropeptides (substance P) released from peripheral nerves. This release may be caused by inappropriate cross-talk between sensory and motor fibers at the affected site. CRPS is not a psychological illness, yet pain can cause psychological problems, such as anxiety and depression. Often, impaired social and occupational function occur.

Complex regional pain syndrome is a multifactorial disorder with clinical features of neurogenic inflammation (inflammation mediated by nerve cells), nociceptive sensitisation (which causes extreme sensitivity or allodynia), vasomotor dysfunction (blood flow problems which cause swelling and discolouration) and maladaptive neuroplasticity (where the brain changes and adapts with constant pain signals); CRPS is the result of an "aberrant [inappropriate] response to tissue injury". The "underlying neuronal matrix" of CRPS is seen to involve cognitive and motor as well as nociceptive processing; pinprick stimulation of a CRPS affected limb was painful (mechanical hyperalgesia) and showed a "significantly increased activation" of not just the S1 cortex (contralateral), S2 (bilateral) areas, and insula (bilateral) but also the associative-somatosensory cortices (contralateral), frontal cortices, and parts of the anterior cingulate cortex. In contrast to previous thoughts reflected in the name RSD, it appears that there is reduced sympathetic nervous system outflow, at least in the affected region (although there may be sympatho-afferent coupling). Wind-up (the increased sensation of pain with time) and central nervous system (CNS) sensitization are key neurologic processes that appear to be involved in the induction and maintenance of CRPS.

Compelling evidence shows that the N-methyl-D-aspartate (NMDA) receptor has significant involvement in the CNS sensitization process. It is also hypothesized that elevated CNS glutamate levels promote wind-up and CNS sensitization. In addition, there exists experimental evidence demonstrating the presence of NMDA receptors in peripheral nerves. Because immunological functions can modulate CNS physiology, a variety of immune processes have also been hypothesized to contribute to the initial development and maintenance of peripheral and central sensitization. Furthermore, trauma-related cytokine release, exaggerated neurogenic inflammation, sympathetic afferent coupling, adrenoreceptor pathology, glial cell activation, cortical reorganisation, and oxidative damage (e.g., by free radicals) are all factors which have been implicated in the pathophysiology of CRPS. In addition, autoantibodies are present in a wide number of CRPS patients and IgG has been recognized as one of the causes of hypersensitivity that stimulates A and C nociceptors, attributing to the inflammation.

The mechanisms leading to reduced bone mineral density (up to overt osteoporosis) are still unknown. Potential explanations include a dysbalance of the activities of sympathetic and parasympathetic autonomic nervous system and mild secondary hyperparathyroidism. However, the trigger of secondary hyperparathyroidism has not yet been identified.

In summary, the pathophysiology of complex regional pain syndrome has not yet been defined; CRPS, with its variable manifestations, could be the result of multiple pathophysiological processes.

== Diagnosis ==
Diagnosis is primarily based on clinical findings. The original diagnostic criteria for CRPS adopted by the International Association for the Study of Pain (IASP) in 1994 have now been superseded in both clinical practice and research by the "Budapest Criteria" which were created in 2003 and have been found to be more sensitive and specific. They have since been adopted by the IASP. The criteria require there to be pain as well as a history and clinical evidence of sensory, vasomotor, sudomotor, and motor or trophic changes. It is also stated that it is a diagnosis of exclusion.

To make a clinical diagnosis all four of the following criteria must be met:

1. Continuing pain, which is disproportionate to any inciting event
2. Must report at least one symptom in three of the four following categories.
  - Sensory: Reports of hyperesthesia
  - Vasomotor: Reports of temperature asymmetry or skin color changes or skin color asymmetry
  - Sudomotor/Edema: Reports of edema or sweating changes or sweating asymmetry
  - Motor/Trophic: Reports of decreased range of motion or motor dysfunction (weakness, tremor, dystonia) or trophic changes (hair, nail, skin)
3. Must display at least one sign at time of evaluation in two or more of the following categories
  - Sensory: Evidence of hyperalgesia (to pinprick) or allodynia (to light touch or temperature sensation or deep somatic pressure or joint movement)
  - Vasomotor: Evidence of temperature asymmetry (>1 °C (1.8 °F)) or skin color changes or asymmetry
  - Sudomotor/Edema: Evidence of edema or sweating changes or sweating asymmetry
  - Motor/Trophic: Evidence of decreased range of motion or motor dysfunction (weakness, tremor, dystonia) or trophic changes (hair, nail, skin)
4. There is no other diagnosis that better explains the signs and symptoms

=== Diagnostic adjuncts ===
No specific test is available for CRPS, which is diagnosed primarily through observation of the symptoms. However, thermography, sweat testing, X-rays, electrodiagnostics, and sympathetic blocks can be used to build up a picture of the disorder. Diagnosis is complicated by the fact that some patients improve without treatment. A delay in diagnosis or treatment for this syndrome can result in severe physical and psychological problems. Early recognition and prompt treatment provide the greatest opportunity for recovery.

==== Thermography ====
Presently, established empirical evidence suggests against thermography's efficacy as a reliable tool for diagnosing CRPS. Although CRPS may, in some cases, lead to measurably altered blood flow throughout an affected region, many other factors can also contribute to an altered thermographic reading, including the patient's smoking habits, use of certain skin lotions, recent physical activity, and prior history of trauma to the region. Also, not all patients diagnosed with CRPS demonstrate such "vasomotor instability"—particularly those in the later stages of the disease. Thus, thermography alone cannot be used as conclusive evidence for—or against—a diagnosis of CRPS and must be interpreted in light of the patient's larger medical history and prior diagnostic studies.

In order to minimise the confounding influence of external factors, patients undergoing infrared thermographic testing must conform to special restrictions regarding the use of certain vasoconstrictors (namely, nicotine and caffeine), skin lotions, physical therapy, and other diagnostic procedures in the days prior to testing. Patients may also be required to discontinue certain pain medications and sympathetic blockers. After a patient arrives at a thermographic laboratory, he or she is allowed to reach thermal equilibrium in a 16–20 °C (61–68 °F), draft-free, steady-state room wearing a loose fitting cotton hospital gown for approximately twenty minutes. A technician then takes infrared images of both the patient's affected and unaffected limbs, as well as reference images of other parts of the patient's body, including his or her face, upper back, and lower back. After capturing a set of baseline images, some labs further require the patient to undergo cold-water autonomic-functional-stress-testing to evaluate the function of their autonomic nervous system's peripheral vasoconstrictor reflex. This is performed by placing a patient's unaffected limb in a cold water bath (approximately 20 °C (68 °F)) for five minutes while collecting images. In a normal, intact, functioning autonomic nervous system, a patient's affected extremity will become colder. Conversely, warming of an affected extremity may indicate a disruption of the body's normal thermoregulatory vasoconstrictor function, which may sometimes indicate underlying CRPS.

==== Radiography ====
Scintigraphy, plain radiographs, and magnetic resonance imaging may all be useful diagnostically. Patchy osteoporosis (post-traumatic osteoporosis), which may be due to disuse of the affected extremity, can be detected through X-ray imagery as early as two weeks after the onset of CRPS. A bone scan of the affected limb may detect these changes even sooner and can almost confirm the disease. Bone densitometry can also be used to detect changes in bone mineral density. It can also be used to monitor the results of treatment since bone densitometry parameters improve with treatment.

==== Ultrasound ====
Ultrasound-based osteodensitometry (ultrasonometry) may be a potential future radiation-free technique to identify reduced bone mineral density in CRPS. Additionally, this method promises to quantify the bone architecture in the periphery of affected limbs. This method is still under experimental development.

==== Electrodiagnostic testing ====
Electromyography (EMG) and nerve conduction studies (NCS) are important ancillary tests in CRPS because they are among the most reliable methods of detecting nerve injury. They can be used as one of the primary methods to distinguish between CRPS types I and II, which differ based on evidence of actual nerve damage. EMG and NCS are also among the best tests for ruling in or out alternative diagnoses. CRPS is a "diagnosis of exclusion", which requires that no other diagnosis can explain the patient's symptoms. This is very important to emphasise because patients otherwise can be given a wrong diagnosis of CRPS when they actually have a treatable condition that better accounts for their symptoms. An example is severe carpal tunnel syndrome (CTS), which can often present in a very similar way to CRPS. Unlike CRPS, CTS can often be corrected with surgery to alleviate the pain and avoid permanent nerve damage and malformation.

Both EMG and NCS involve some measure of discomfort. EMG involves the use of a tiny needle inserted into specific muscles to test the associated muscle and nerve function. Both EMG and NCS involve very mild shocks that in normal patients are comparable to a rubber band snapping on the skin. Although these tests can be very useful in CRPS, thorough informed consent must be obtained prior to the procedure, particularly in patients experiencing severe allodynia. In spite of the utility of the test, these patients may wish to decline the procedure to avoid discomfort.

==== Classification ====
- Type I, formerly known as reflex sympathetic dystrophy (RSD), Sudeck's atrophy, or algoneurodystrophy, does not exhibit demonstrable nerve lesions. As the vast majority of patients diagnosed with CRPS have this type, it is most commonly referred to in medical literature as type I.
- Type II, formerly known as causalgia, has evidence of obvious nerve damage. Despite evidence of nerve injury, the cause or the mechanisms of CRPS type II are as unknown, as the mechanisms of type I.

Patients are frequently classified into two groups based upon temperature: "warm" or "hot" CRPS in one group and "cold" CRPS in the other group. The majority of patients (about 70%) have the "hot" type, which is said to be an acute form of CRPS. Cold CRPS is said to be indicative of a more chronic CRPS and is associated with poorer McGill Pain Questionnaire scores, increased central nervous system reorganisation, and a higher prevalence of dystonia. Prognosis is not favourable for cold CRPS patients; longitudinal studies suggest these patients have "poorer clinical pain outcomes and show persistent signs of central sensitisation correlating with disease progression".

== Prevention ==
Vitamin C supplementation may be useful in prevention of the syndrome following fracture of the forearm, foot, or ankle.

== Treatment ==
Treatment of CRPS often involves a number of modalities.

=== Therapy ===
Physical and occupational therapy have low-quality evidence to support their use. Physical therapy interventions may include transcutaneous electrical nerve stimulation, progressive weight bearing, graded tactile desensitization, massage, and contrast bath therapy. In a retrospective cohort (unblinded, non-randomized, and with intention-to-treat) of fifty patients diagnosed with CRPS, patients' subjective pain and body perception scores decreased after engagement with a two-week multidisciplinary rehabilitation program. The authors call for randomized controlled trials to probe the true value of interdisciplinary programs for CRPS patients.

==== Mirror box therapy ====
Mirror box therapy uses a mirror box, or a stand-alone mirror, to reflect the normal limb so that the patient thinks they are looking at the affected limb. Movement of this reflected normal limb is then performed so that it seems to the patient as though they are performing movement with the affected limb. Mirror box therapy appears to be beneficial at least in early CRPS. However, the beneficial effects of mirror therapy in the long term are still unproven.

==== Graded motor imagery ====
Graded motor imagery appears to be useful for people with CRPS-1. Graded motor imagery is a sequential process that consists of (a) laterality reconstruction, (b) motor imagery, and (c) mirror therapy.

==== Transcutaneous electrical nerve stimulation ====
Transcutaneous electrical nerve stimulation (TENS) is a therapy that uses low-voltage electrical signals to provide pain relief through electrodes that are placed on the surface of the skin. Evidence supports its use in treating pain and edema associated with CRPS, but it does not seem to increase functional ability in CRPS patients.

=== Medications ===
Tentative evidence supports the use of bisphosphonates, calcitonin, and ketamine. Nerve blocks with guanethidine appear to be harmful. Evidence for sympathetic nerve blocks generally is insufficient to support their use. Intramuscular botulinum injections may benefit people with symptoms localized to one extremity.

==== Ketamine ====
Ketamine, a dissociative anesthetic, appears promising as a treatment for CRPS. It may be used in low doses if other treatments have not worked. No benefit on either function or depression, however, has been seen.

==== Bisphosphonate treatment ====
As of 2013, high-quality evidence supports the use of bisphosphonates (either orally or via IV infusion) in the treatment of CRPS. Bisphosphonates inhibit osteoclasts: cells involved in the resorption of bone. Bone remodeling (via osteoclast activity in bone resorption) is sometimes thought to be hyperactive in CRPS. It is hypothesized that bone resorption causes acidification of the intercellular milieu, which, in turn, activates nerves involved in nociception that densely innervate bone and cause pain. Therefore, inhibiting bone resorption and remodeling is thought to help with regard to CRPS pain. CRPS involving high levels of bone resorption, as seen on bone scan, is more likely to respond to bisphosphonate therapy.

==== Opioids ====
Opioids such as oxycodone, morphine, hydrocodone, and fentanyl have a controversial place in the treatment of CRPS. These drugs must be prescribed and monitored under close supervision of a physician as they can quickly lead to physical dependence and addiction. To date so far, no long-term studies of oral opioid use in treating neuropathic pain, including CRPS, have been performed. The consensus among experts is that opioids should not be a first-line therapy and should be considered only after all other modalities (e.g., non-opioid medications, physical therapy, and procedures) have been trialed.

=== Surgery ===
==== Spinal cord stimulators ====
Spinal cord stimulation appears to be an effective therapy in the management of patients with CRPS type I (level A evidence) and type II (level D evidence). Although they improve patient pain and quality of life, evidence regarding their effects on mental health and general functioning is unclear.

Dorsal root ganglion stimulation is a type of neurostimulation effective in managing focal neuropathic pain. The FDA approved its use in February 2016. The ACCURATE Study demonstrated superiority of dorsal root ganglion stimulation over spinal (dorsal column) stimulation in the management of CRPS and causalgia.

==== Sympathectomy ====
Surgical, chemical, or radiofrequency sympathectomy—interruption of the affected portion of the sympathetic nervous system—can be used as a last resort in patients with impending tissue loss, edema, recurrent infection, or ischemic necrosis. However, little evidence supports these permanent interventions to alter the pain symptoms of the affected patients, and in addition to the normal risks of surgery, such as bleeding and infection, sympathectomy has several specific risks, such as adverse changes in how nerves function.

==== Amputation ====
No randomized study in the medical literature has studied the response to amputation of patients who have failed the therapies mentioned above and who continue to be in pain. Nonetheless, on average, about half of the patients will have resolution of their pain, while half will develop phantom limb pain or pain at the amputation site. As in any other chronic pain syndrome, the brain likely becomes chronically stimulated with pain, and late amputation may not work as well as it might be expected. In a survey of 15 patients with CRPS type 1, 11 responded that their lives were better after amputation.

=== Other ===
Cannabidiol, despite evidence of very low quality, is proposed to relieve pain.

== Prognosis ==
The prognosis of CRPS improves with early and aggressive treatment, and the risk of chronic, debilitating pain is reduced with early treatment. If treatment is delayed, however, the disorder can quickly spread to the entire limb, and changes in bone, nerve, and muscle may become irreversible. The prognosis is worse for the chronic "cold" form of CRPS and for CRPS affecting the upper extremities. Inactivity of the limb following an injury, whether due to pain or recovery or, in some instances, psychological distress after the injury, can lead to deconditioning. The absence of movement contributes to muscle atrophy, swelling, joint stiffness and pain, and reduced circulation, among other processes. This sequence of physiological changes not only intensifies the symptoms of CRPS but is also associated with a less favorable prognosis. Some cases of CRPS may resolve spontaneously, with 74% of patients in a Minnesota study experiencing complete symptom resolution, while others may have chronic or relapsing-and-remitting disease. Once one is diagnosed with CRPS, should it go into remission, the likelihood of it resurfacing after remission is considerable, around 10–30%. Taking precautions and seeking immediate treatment upon any injury is important.

== Epidemiology ==
CRPS can occur at any age, with the average age at diagnosis being 42. It affects both men and women; however, CRPS is three times more frequent in females than males.CRPS affects both adults and children, and the number of reported CRPS cases among adolescents and young adults has been increasing, with a recent observational study finding an incidence of 1.16/100,000 among children in Scotland.

== History ==
The condition currently known as CRPS was originally described by Ambroise Paré, who treated a severe and persistent pain syndrome suffered by Charles IX of France after a limb phlebotomy. Silas Weir Mitchell is sometimes credited with inventing the name "causalgia" during the American Civil War. However, the term was actually coined by Mitchell's friend Robley Dunglison from the Greek words for heat and pain. Causalgia, linked to neurological lesions, is significantly influenced by vasomotor and sudomotor symptoms. In the 1940s, the term "reflex sympathetic dystrophy" was introduced, highlighting the role of sympathetic hyperactivity in its pathophysiology. In 1959, Noordenbos observed in causalgia patients that "the damage of the nerve is always partial." Misuse of the terms, as well as doubts about the underlying pathophysiology, led to calls for better nomenclature. In 1993, a special consensus workshop held in Orlando, Florida, provided the umbrella term "complex regional pain syndrome", with causalgia and reflex sympathetic dystrophy as subtypes.

== Research ==
The National Institute of Neurological Disorders and Stroke (NINDS), a part of the National Institutes of Health, supports and conducts research on the brain and central nervous system, including research relevant to RSDS, through grants to major medical institutions across the country. NINDS-supported scientists are working to develop effective treatments for neurological conditions and ultimately, to find ways of preventing them. Investigators are studying new approaches to treat CRPS and intervene more aggressively after traumatic injury to lower the patient's chances of developing the disorder. In addition, NINDS-supported scientists are studying how signals of the sympathetic nervous system cause pain in CRPS patients. Using a technique called microneurography, these investigators are able to record and measure neural activity in single nerve fibers of affected patients. By testing various hypotheses, these researchers hope to discover the unique mechanism that causes the spontaneous pain of CRPS, and that discovery may lead to new ways of blocking pain. Other studies to overcome chronic pain syndromes are discussed in the pamphlet "Chronic Pain: Hope Through Research", published by the NINDS.

Research into treating the condition with mirror visual feedback is being undertaken at the Royal National Hospital for Rheumatic Disease in Bath. Patients are taught how to desensitize in the most effective way, then progress to using mirrors to rewrite the faulty signals in the brain that appear responsible for this condition. However, while CRPS can go into remission, the chance of it reoccurring is significant.The Netherlands has the most comprehensive program of research into CRPS, as part of a multimillion-Euro initiative called TREND. German and Australian research teams are also pursuing better understanding and treatments for CRPS.

== In other animal species ==
CRPS has also been described in non-human animals, such as cattle.

== Notable cases ==
- Paula Abdul, singer, actor, TV personality
- Jill Kinmont Boothe, US ski slalom champion
- Danielle Brown, British paralympic archer
- Gemma Collis-McCann, British paralympic fencer
- Radene Marie Cook, former Los Angeles radio broadcaster, artist, and advocate
- Shin Dong-wook, South Korean actor and model
- Howard Hughes, American business tycoon, aviator, inventor, filmmaker, and philanthropist
- Maya Kowalski, subject of the 2023 documentary film Take Care of Maya
- Rachel Morris, British paralympic cyclist
- Cynthia Toussaint, author and media personality
- Marieke Vervoort, Belgian Paralympic athlete
