= Phantom limb =

Sensation that an amputated or missing limb is attached

- A cat attempting to use its left foreleg to scoop litter several months after it has been amputated
- Specialty: Neurology

Phantom limb refers to brain's perception of pain in a limb that has been surgically amputated and is one of the most common sequelae of limb loss, with prevalence estimates ranging from 50% to 80% of all individuals who undergo amputation. Phantom limb can also present itself in two ways: phantom limb pain (PLP) or phantom limb sensations. Phantom limb pain is a painful or unpleasant sensation experienced where the amputated limb was. Phantom sensations are any other, nonpainful sensations perceived in the amputated or missing limb area.

== Signs and symptoms ==
Majority (50%-80%) of amputees experience a phantom limb, with some of them having non-painful sensations. The amputee may feel very strongly that the phantom limb is still part of the body. People will sometimes feel as if they are gesturing, feel itches, twitch, or even try to pick things up with their non-existing limbs. The missing limb often feels shorter and may feel as if it is in a distorted and painful position. Occasionally, the pain can be made worse by stress, anxiety and weather changes. Exposure to extreme weather conditions, especially below freezing temperatures, can cause increased sensitivity to the sensation. Phantom limb pain is usually intermittent, but can be continuous in some cases. The frequency and intensity of attacks usually declines with time.

Repressed memories in phantom limbs could potentially explain the reason for existing sensations after amputation. Specifically, there have been several reports from patients of painful clenching spasms in the phantom hand with the feeling of their nails digging into their palms. The motor output is amplified due to the missing limb; therefore, the patient may experience the overflow of information as pain. The patient contains repressed memories from previous motor commands of clenching the hand and sensory information from digging their nails into their palm. These memories remain due to previous neural connections in the brain.

== Phantom limb syndrome ==
The term "phantom limb" was coined in 1872 by a physician named Silas Weir Mitchell, who, almost poetically, reported that '...nearly every man who loses limb carries about with him constant or inconstant phantom of the missing member, sensory ghost of that much of himself, and sometimes most inconvenient presence, faintly felt at times, but ready to be called up to his perception by blow, touch, or change of wind'. Nevertheless, there have been earlier reports of the phenomenon. One of the first known medical descriptions of the phantom limb phenomenon was written by a French military surgeon, Ambroise Pare, in the sixteenth century. Pare noticed that some of his patients continued reporting pain in the removed limb after he performed the amputation. For many years, the dominant hypothesis for the cause of phantom limbs was irritation in the peripheral nervous system at the amputation site (neuroma). By the late 1980s, Ronald Melzack had recognized that the peripheral neuroma account could not be correct, because many people born without limbs also experienced phantom limbs. According to Melzack the experience of the body is created by a wide network of interconnecting neural structures, which he called the "neuromatrix".

Pons and colleagues (1991) at the National Institutes of Health (NIH) showed that the primary somatosensory cortex in macaque monkeys undergoes substantial reorganization after the loss of sensory input.

Hearing about these results, V. S. Ramachandran hypothesized that phantom limb sensations in humans could be due to reorganization in the human brain's somatosensory cortex. Ramachandran and colleagues illustrated this hypothesis by showing that stroking different parts of the face led to perceptions of being touched on different parts of the missing limb. Later brain scans of amputees showed the same kind of cortical reorganization that Pons had observed in monkeys. Ramachandran have also performed the world's first phantom limb amputation surgeries by asking patients to visualize the missing limb, which relieved pain, and in the long term completely removed the sensation of a phantom limb – the method is now known as the mirror therapy.

Maladaptive changes in the cortex may account for some but not all phantom limb pain. Pain researchers such as Tamar Makin (Oxford) and Marshall Devor (Hebrew University, Jerusalem) argue that phantom limb pain is primarily the result of "junk" inputs from the peripheral nervous system. Despite a great deal of research on the underlying neural mechanisms of phantom limb pain there is still no clear consensus as to its cause. Both the brain and the peripheral nervous system may be involved.

Research continues into more precise mechanisms and explanations.

== Classifications of Phantom Limb ==
Phantom limb syndrome (PLS) is a sensation that the amputated or missing limb is still attached to the body. This is different from residual limb pain (RLP) that is often experienced by people with amputations. While RLP occurs in the remaining or residual body part, the pain or sensation associated with PLS can be experienced in the entire limb or just one portion of the missing limb. There are 3 differentiated types of phantom sensations: kinetic, kinesthetic, and exteroceptive. Kinetic phantom sensations are perceived movements of the amputated body part (i.e., feeling your toes flex). Kinesthetic phantom sensations are related to the size, shape, or position of the amputated body part (i.e., feeling as if your hand is in a twisted position). Exteroceptive phantom sensations are related to sensations perceived to be felt by the amputated body part (i.e., feelings of touch, pressure, tingling, temperature, itch, and vibrations).

An additional sensation that some people with amputations experience is known as telescoping. Telescoping is when you feel as if your amputated limb is becoming more proximal to your body through progressive shortening.

Phantom sensations may also occur after the removal of body parts other than the limbs, for example, after amputation of the breast, extraction of a tooth (phantom tooth pain) or removal of an eye (phantom eye syndrome).

Phantom sensations have been noted in the transgender population. Some people who have undergone sex reassignment surgery (SRS) have reported the sensation of phantom genitals. The reports were less common among post-operative transgender women, but did occur in transgender men. Phantom penises in pre-SRS transgender men have been documented to be similar to the rate of phantom sensations in cis men post-penectomy. Similarly, subjects who had undergone mastectomy reported experiencing phantom breasts; these reports were substantially less common among post-operative transgender men.

Phantom limb pain (PLP) is broadly classified as a form of neuropathic pain, and its pathophysiology is understood to be multifactorial, involving complex peripheral nerve mechanisms. The complexities of these mechanisms, together with psychosocial modulators such as pre-amputation pain and anxiety renders PLP a particularly challenging chronic condition to manage for amputees.Conventional pharmacological approaches have shown limited and inconsistent efficacy, therefore research continues to explore the underlying mechanisms of phantom limb and effective treatment options.

== Neural Mechanisms ==
Pain, temperature, touch, and pressure information are carried to the central nervous system via the anterolateral system (spinothalamic tracts, spinoreticular tract, spinomesencefalic tract), with pain and temperature information transferred via lateral spinothalamic tracts to the primary sensory cortex, located in the postcentral gyrus in the parietal lobe, where sensory information is represented somatotropically, forming the sensory homunculus. Somatotopic representation seems to be a factor in the experience of phantom limb, with larger regions in the sensory homunculus typically experiencing more phantom sensations or pain. These areas include the hands, feet, fingers and toes.

In phantom limb syndrome, there is sensory input indicating pain from a part of the body that is no longer existent. This phenomenon is still not fully understood, but it is hypothesized that it is caused by activation of the somatosensory cortex. One theory is it may be related to central sensitization, which is a common experience among amputees. Central sensitization is when there are changes in the responsiveness of the neurons in the dorsal horn of the spinal cord, which deals with processing somatosensory information, due to increased activity from the peripheral nociceptors. Peripheral nociceptors are sensory neurons that alert us to potentially damaging stimuli.

There are theories that the phantom limb phenomenon may relate to reorganization of the somatosensory cortex after the limb is removed. When the body receives tactile input near the residual limb, the brain is convinced that the sensory input was received from the amputated limb because another brain region took over. Reorganization has been thought to be related to sensory-discriminative parts of pain as well as the affective-emotional parts of it (I.e., insula, the anterior cingulate cortex, and the frontal cortices).

Phantom sensations can also occur when there has been a peripheral nerve injury resulting in deafferentation. This causes changes in the dorsal horn of the spinal cord, which normally has an inhibitory effect on sensory transmission.

== Treatment ==
Most approaches to treatment over the past two decades have not shown consistent symptom improvement. Treatment approaches have included medication such as antidepressants, spinal cord stimulation, vibration therapy, acupuncture, hypnosis, biofeedback, and virtual reality(VR) treatments. Reliable evidence is lacking on whether any treatment is more effective than the others.

A mirror box used for treating phantom limbs, developed by V.S. Ramachandran

Most traditional treatments are not very effective. Ketamine or morphine may be useful around the time of surgery. Morphine may be helpful for longer periods of time. Evidence for gabapentin is mixed. Perineural catheters that provide local anesthetic agents have poor evidence of success when placed after surgery in an effort to prevent phantom limb pain.

One approach that has received public interest is the use of a mirror box. The mirror box provides a reflection of the intact hand or limb that allows the patient to "move" the phantom limb, and to unclench it from potentially painful positions.

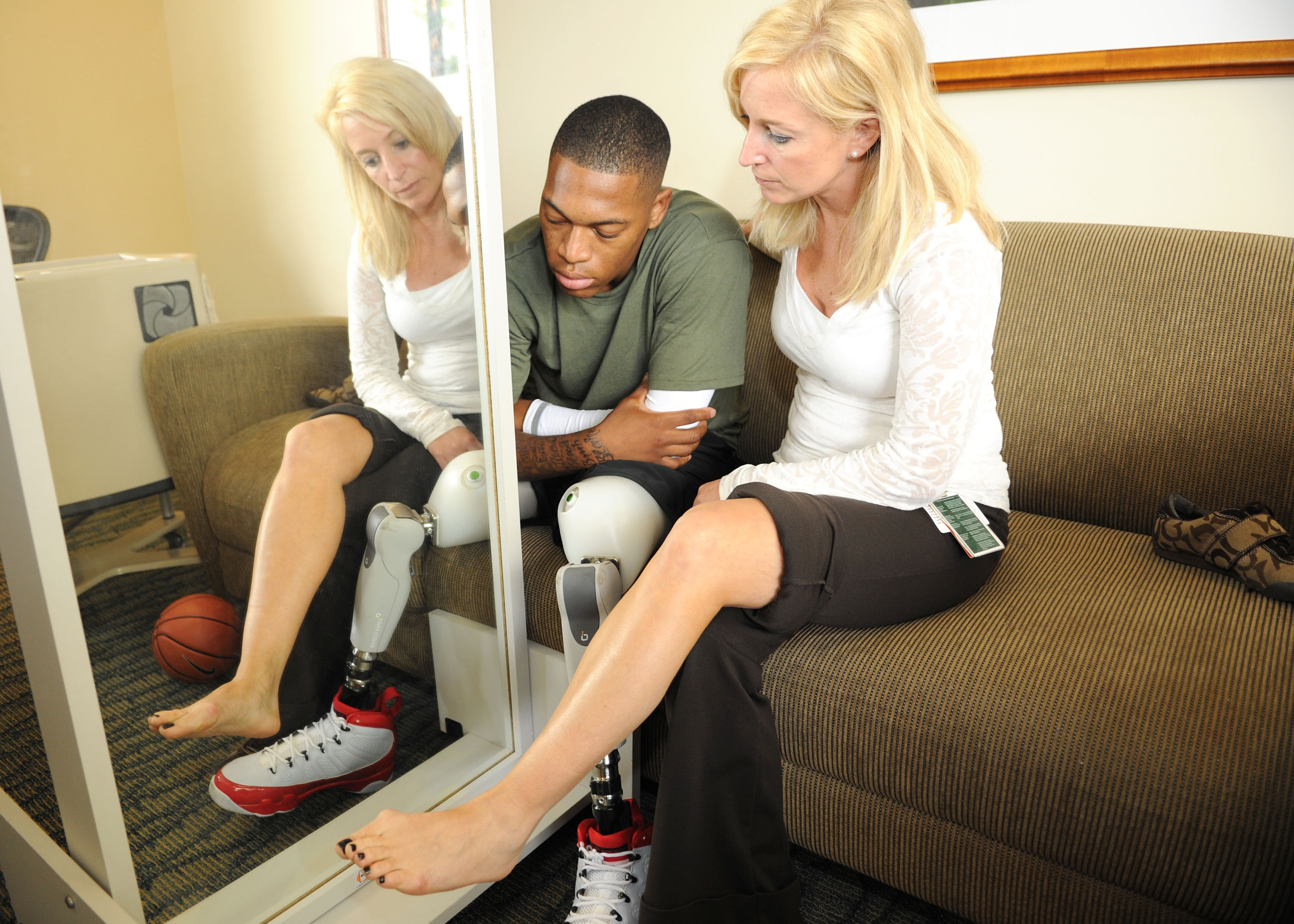
A therapy assistant uses mirror therapy to reduce phantom limb pain for the patient.

Although mirror therapy was introduced by VS Ramachandran in the early 1990s, little research was done on it before 2009, and much of the subsequent research has been of poor quality, according to a 2016 review. A 2018 review, which also criticized the scientific quality of many reports on mirror therapy (MT), found 15 good-quality studies conducted between 2012 and 2017 (out of a pool of 115 publications), and concluded that "MT seems to be effective in relieving PLP, reducing the intensity and duration of daily pain episodes. It is a valid, simple, and inexpensive treatment for PLP." Nevertheless, the debate in the field remains open. A 2025 scoping review reported 'significant heterogeneity of practice' and 'a lack of consensus on treatment frameworks' in the literature, indicating that the effectiveness of the treatment remains hard to assess.

In recent years, VR technology has emerged as a novel treatment against PLP. By rendering a virtual representation of the missing limb, VR enables patients to observe and interact with a virtual limb that responds in real time to residual-limb movements captured via sensors. Multiple case reports across the globe have reported that various VR-based treatments have successfully obtained significant reductions in the pain, according to the patients.

=== Types of VR treatments ===
Targeted Brain Rehabilitation (TBR) is a novel VR-based treatment designed for targeting the central neurological mechanisms underlying PLP. Instead of directly managing symptoms, TBR aims to prevent and reverse cortical reorganization through a structured, four-phase protocol delivered via a professional VR headset. The four phases are as follows: laterality recognition, guided motor imagery, virtual mirror feedback, and guided motor execution. They are being administered in order, with each phase targeting progressively higher order cortical processes involved in PLP. This progression is found based on prior graded motor imagery research showing that engaging the primary motor cortex too early can worsen pain in chronic pain populations, so the graduated structure also acts as a safety mechanism.

Case reports: In a feasibility and usability study of 18 upper-extremity amputees, Chandler et al. reported that a single guided TBR session was associated with high patient comfort (8.8 ± 1.1 out of 10), high satisfaction (8.9 ± 1.2), and strong usability on the system usability scale (86.8 ± 11.8). Simulator sickness was minimal during the study, indicating that the immersive environment is well tolerated during this study.

In a related and similar study with 36 upper-extremity amputees, Serbin et al. found that TBR produced a significant reduction in pain intensity using the Numeric Pain Rating Scale, with scores dropping from 5.0 ± 2.0 at baseline to 2.0 ± 1.6 after a single session. Notably, 90% of participants reported changes in PLP after the session, and majority of participants identified the guided motor execution phase (fourth phase) as the most helpful component for pain relief, phantom limb control, and positional awareness. These findings may have suggested that TBR is a potentially effective novel treatment for PLP management.

Phantom Motor Imagery (PMI) is another VR-based approach to PLP management. It relies on the mental rehearsal of phantom movements rather than their overt execution. PMI was evaluated alongside phantom motor execution (PME) in what is, to date, one of the largest international RCTs for non-pharmacological PLP treatment.

Case reports: Lendaro et al. conducted a multicenter and double-blind trial across 9 outpatient clinics in seven countries, including 81 participants with chronic PLP. The trial was designed as a superiority study, hypothesizing that the active motor engagement in PME would produce greater pain relief than imagery alone. The primary outcome was the change in PLP measured by the Pain Rating Index (PRI) from the Short-Form McGill Pain Questionnaire between baseline and end of treatment. PLP decreased by 64.5% in the PME group and 68.2% in the PMI group, indicating good efficacy of both treatments. Clinically meaningful pain reductions (decrease ≥50% in PRI) were achieved by 71% of PME participants and 68% of PMI participants. Both groups also showed improvements across secondary outcomes, including pain catastrophizing, mood, disability, and pain interference with sleep and daily activities, and again with no between-group differences. At follow-up, there were reports on partial rebounds in pain after treatment stopped, but scores stabilized below baseline around 3 and 6 months, indicating descent durability of the pain relief.

Graded Motor Imagery (GMI) is a structured rehabilitation approach that has been adapted specifically for home-based treatment.

Case reports: A research done by Rierola-Fochs et al included 36 participants with upper or lower limb amputations followed the GMI protocol or continued their existing treatment for 9 weeks. Statistically significant between-group differences in PLP were observed at the end of the treatment, while the within-group analysis also showed clinically significant reductions that persisted at 12 weeks of follow-up. However, no significant differences were found in secondary outcomes including quality of life, functionality, or depressive symptoms, and the sample size remained rather small.

Another group of researchers, El-Gabalawy et al., have taken the GMI concept further by integrating it into an immersive VR platform, named PIVOT, which was targeting specifically the acute postoperative period immediately after the amputation. This is notable because PLP has been shown to be most prevalent and severe immediately after surgery, yet very few interventions have been evaluated in this early window. The PIVOT program includes four parts: collaboration with patient partners, feedback from individuals with lived experience of amputation, a descriptive case series conducted in hospital, and the ongoing final feasibility phase. As of early 2025, the feasibility phase was underway with 15 participants recruited, and the authors plan to proceed to a full randomized control trial (RCT) pending acceptable feasibility outcomes. The PIVOT program shifts the focus toward a preemptive PLP treatment rather than the traditional treatment which treat the symptom once they are fully established, thus making it a more promising approach.

== See also ==
- Neuropathic pain
- Supernumerary phantom limb, where sensations are felt in a limb that never existed
- Synesthesia
- Visual release hallucinations
