= Sensory processing =

Process that distinguishes an organism's sensory information

Sensory processing is the process that organizes and distinguishes sensation (sensory information) from one's own body and the environment, thus making it possible to use the body effectively within the environment. Specifically, it deals with how the brain processes multiple sensory modality inputs, such as proprioception, vision, auditory system, tactile, olfactory, vestibular system, interoception, and taste into usable functional outputs.

Inputs from different sensory organs are processed in different areas in the brain. The communication within and among these specialized areas of the brain is known as functional integration. Newer research has shown that these different regions of the brain may not be solely responsible for only one sensory modality, but could use multiple inputs to perceive what the body senses about its environment. Multisensory integration is necessary for almost every activity that people perform because the combination of multiple sensory inputs is essential for them to comprehend their surroundings.

== Projection areas ==
The different senses were always thought to be controlled by separate lobes of the brain, called projection areas. The lobes of the brain are the classifications that divide the brain both anatomically and functionally. These lobes are the Frontal lobe, responsible for conscious thought, Parietal lobe, responsible for visuospatial processing, the Occipital lobe, responsible for the sense of sight, and the temporal lobe, responsible for the senses of smell and sound. From the earliest times of neurology, it has been thought that these lobes are solely responsible for their one sensory modality input. However, newer research has shown that that may not entirely be the case. In the mid-20th century, Gonzalo conducted research that led him to establish cortical functional gradients where functional specificity would be in gradation throughout the cortex.

Using functional neuroimaging, it can be seen that sensory-specific cortices are activated by different inputs. For example, regions in the occipital cortex are tied to vision and those on the superior temporal gyrus are recipients of auditory inputs. There exist studies suggesting deeper multisensory convergences than those at the sensory-specific cortices, which were listed earlier. This convergence of multiple sensory modalities is known as multisensory integration.

Sensory processing deals with how the brain processes sensory input from multiple sensory modalities. These include the five classic senses of vision (sight), audition (hearing), tactile stimulation (touch), olfaction (smell), and gustation (taste). Other sensory modalities exist, for example the vestibular sense (balance and the sense of movement), proprioception (the sense of knowing one's position in space) and time (The sense of knowing where one is in time or activities). It is important that the information of these different sensory modalities must be relatable. The sensory inputs themselves are in different electrical signals, and in different contexts. Through sensory processing, the brain can relate all sensory inputs into a coherent percept, upon which an organism's interaction with the environment is ultimately based.

== Sensory integration ==
One of the earliest sensations is the olfactory sensation. Evolutionary, gustation and olfaction developed together. This multisensory integration was necessary for early humans in order to ensure that they were receiving proper nutrition from their food, and also to make sure that they were not consuming poisonous materials. There are several other sensory integrations that developed early on in the human evolutionary timeline. The integration between vision and audition was necessary for spatial mapping. Integration between vision and tactile sensations developed along with our finer motor skills including better hand-eye coordination. While humans developed into bipedal organisms, balance became exponentially more essential to survival. The multisensory integration between visual inputs, vestibular (balance) inputs, and proprioception inputs played an important role in our development into upright walkers.

=== Audiovisual system ===
Perhaps one of the most studied sensory integrations is the relationship between vision and audition. These two senses perceive the same objects in the world in different ways, and by combining the two, they help us understand this information better. Vision dominates our perception of the world around us. This is because visual spatial information is one of the most reliable sensory modalities. Visual stimuli are recorded directly onto the retina, and there are few, if any, external distortions that provide incorrect information to the brain about the true location of an object. Other spatial information is not as reliable as visual spatial information. For example, consider auditory spatial input. The location of an object can sometimes be determined solely on its sound, but the sensory input can easily be modified or altered, thus giving a less reliable spatial representation of the object. Auditory information therefore is not spatially represented unlike visual stimuli. But once one has the spatial mapping from the visual information, multisensory integration helps bring the information from both the visual and auditory stimuli together to make a more robust mapping.

There have been studies done that show that a dynamic neural mechanism exists for matching the auditory and visual inputs from an event that stimulates multiple senses. One example of this that has been observed is how the brain compensates for target distance. When you are speaking with someone or watching something happen, auditory and visual signals are not being processed concurrently, but they are perceived as being simultaneous. This kind of multisensory integration can lead to slight misperceptions in the visual-auditory system in the form of the ventriloquism effect. An example of the ventriloquism effect is when a person on the television appears to have his voice coming from his mouth, rather than the television's speakers. This occurs because of a pre-existing spatial representation within the brain which is programmed to think that voices come from another human's mouth. This then makes it so the visual response to the audio input is spatially misrepresented, and therefore misaligned.

=== Sensorimotor system ===
Hand–eye coordination is one example of sensory integration. In this case, we require a tight integration of what we visually perceive about an object, and what we tactilely perceive about that same object. If these two senses were not combined within the brain, then one would have less ability to manipulate an object. Eye–hand coordination is the tactile sensation in the context of the visual system. The visual system is very static, in that it does not move around much, but the hands and other parts used in tactile sensory collection can freely move around. This movement of the hands must be included in the mapping of both the tactile and visual sensations, otherwise one would not be able to comprehend where they were moving their hands, and what they were touching and looking at. An example of this happening is looking at an infant. The infant picks up objects and puts them in his mouth, or touches them to his feet or face. All of these actions are culminating to the formation of spatial maps in the brain and the realization that "Hey, that thing that's moving this object is actually a part of me." Seeing the same thing that they are feeling is a major step in the mapping that is required for infants to begin to realize that they can move their arms and interact with an object. This is the earliest and most explicit way of experiencing sensory integration.

=== Problems ===
Sometimes there can be a problem with the encoding of the sensory information. This disorder is known as sensory processing disorder (SPD). This disorder can be further classified into three main types.

- Sensory modulation disorder, in which patients seek sensory stimulation due to an over or under response to sensory stimuli.
- Sensory based motor disorder. Patients have incorrect processing of motor information that leads to poor motor skills.
- Sensory processing disorder or sensory discrimination disorder, which is characterized by postural control problems, lack of attentiveness, and disorganization.

== History ==
In the 1930s, Wilder Penfield was conducting a very bizarre operation at the Montreal Neurological Institute. Penfield "pioneered the incorporation of neurophysiological principles in the practice of neurosurgery. Penfield was interested in determining a solution to solve the epileptic seizure problems that his patients were having. He used an electrode to stimulate different regions of the brain's cortex, and would ask his still conscious patient what he or she felt. This process led to the publication of his book, The Cerebral Cortex of Man. The "mapping" of the sensations his patients felt led Penfield to chart out the sensations that were triggered by stimulating different cortical regions. Mrs. H. P. Cantlie was the artist Penfield hired to illustrate his findings. The result was the conception of the first sensory Homunculus.

The Homonculus is a visual representation of the intensity of sensations derived from different parts of the body. Wilder Penfield and his colleague Herbert Jasper developed the Montreal procedure using an electrode to stimulate different parts of the brain to determine which parts were the cause of the epilepsy. This part could then be surgically removed or altered in order to regain optimal brain performance. While performing these tests, they discovered that the functional maps of the sensory and motor cortices were similar in all patients. Because of their novelty at the time, these Homonculi were hailed as the "E=mc² of Neuroscience".

== Current research ==
There are still no definitive answers to the questions regarding the relationship between functional and structural asymmetries in the brain. There are a number of asymmetries in the human brain including how language is processed mainly in the left hemisphere of the brain. There have been some cases, however, in which individuals have comparable language skills to someone who uses his left hemisphere to process language, yet they mainly use their right or both hemispheres. These cases pose the possibility that function may not follow structure in some cognitive tasks. Current research in the fields of sensory processing and multisensory integration is aiming to hopefully unlock the mysteries behind the concept of brain lateralization.

Research on sensory processing has much to offer towards understanding the function of the brain as a whole. The primary task of multisensory integration is to figure out and sort out the vast quantities of sensory information in the body through multiple sensory modalities. Sensory modalities do not operate in isolation, and they frequently convey different aspects of the same stimulus. Where one sensory modality may give information on one part of a situation, another modality can pick up other necessary information. Bringing this information together facilitates better understanding of the physical world around us.

It may seem redundant that we are being provided with multiple sensory inputs about the same object, but that is not necessarily the case. This so-called "redundant" information is in fact verification that what we are experiencing is in fact happening. Perceptions of the world are based on models that we build of the world. Sensory information informs these models, but this information can also confuse the models. Sensory illusions occur when these models do not match up. For example, where our visual system may fool us in one case, our auditory system can bring us back to a ground reality.This prevents sensory misrepresentations, because through the combination of multiple sensory modalities, the model that we create is much more robust and gives a better assessment of the situation. Thinking about it logically, it is far easier to fool one sense than it is to simultaneously fool two or more senses.

== Further research ==
Research on sensory integration may be used to better understand how different sensory modalities are incorporated within the brain to perform tasks. For example, it is not currently understood how neural circuits transform sensory cues into changes in motor activities. More research on the sensorimotor system may help understand how these movements are controlled. This understanding could potentially be used to learn more about how to make better prosthetics, and help patients who have lost the use of a limb. By learning more about how different sensory inputs can combine, new engineering approaches using robotics may be developed. A robot's sensory devices may take in inputs of different modalities; if multisensory integration is better understood, robots might be programmed to convey these data into a useful output.

== See also ==
- Anna Jean Ayres
- Environmental sensitivity
- Ideasthesia
- Developmental coordination disorder
- Motor coordination
- Multisensory integration
- Music therapy
- Occupational therapy
- Sensory-motor coupling
- Predictive coding
- Psychopathology
- Sensory deprivation
- Gut–brain axis
- Neuroinflammation
- Neurodegeneration
- Two-alternative forced choice
- Autism
