= Neuroplasticity =

Ability of the brain to continuously change

Neuroplasticity, also known as neural plasticity or simply plasticity, is the tendency of neural networks in the brain to change through growth and reorganization. Neuroplasticity refers to the brain's ability to reorganize and rewire its neural connections, enabling it to adapt and function in ways that differ from its prior state. This process can occur in response to learning new skills, experiencing environmental changes, recovering from injuries, or adapting to sensory or cognitive deficits. Such adaptability highlights the dynamic and ever-evolving nature of the brain, even into adulthood. These changes range from individual neuron pathways making new connections, to systematic adjustments like cortical remapping or neural oscillation. Other forms of neuroplasticity include homologous area adaptation, cross modal reassignment, map expansion, and compensatory masquerade. Examples of neuroplasticity include circuit and network changes that result from learning a new ability, information acquisition, socio-environmental influences, pregnancy, caloric intake, practice/training, and psychological stress.

Neuroplasticity was once thought by neuroscientists to manifest only during childhood, but research in the later half of the 20th century showed that many aspects of the brain exhibit plasticity through adulthood. The developing brain exhibits a higher degree of plasticity than the adult brain. Activity-dependent plasticity can have significant implications for healthy development, learning, memory, and recovery from brain damage.

== History ==
=== Origin ===
The term plasticity was first applied to behavior in 1890 by William James in The Principles of Psychology where the term was used to describe "a structure weak enough to yield to an influence, but strong enough not to yield all at once". The first person to use the term neural plasticity appears to have been the Polish neuroscientist Jerzy Konorski.

One of the first experiments providing evidence for neuroplasticity was conducted in 1793, by Italian anatomist Michele Vincenzo Malacarne, who described experiments in which he paired animals, trained one of the pair extensively for years, and then dissected both. Malacarne discovered that the cerebellums of the trained animals were substantially larger than the cerebellum of the untrained animals. However, while these findings were significant, they were eventually forgotten. In 1890, the idea that the brain and its function are not fixed throughout adulthood was proposed by William James in The Principles of Psychology, though the idea was largely neglected. Up until the 1970s, neuroscientists believed that the brain's structure and function was essentially fixed throughout adulthood.

While the brain was commonly understood as a nonrenewable organ in the early 1900s, the pioneering neuroscientist Santiago Ramón y Cajal used the term neuronal plasticity to describe nonpathological changes in the structure of adult brains. Based on his renowned neuron doctrine, Cajal first described the neuron as the fundamental unit of the nervous system that later served as an essential foundation to develop the concept of neural plasticity. Many neuroscientists used the term plasticity to explain the regenerative capacity of the peripheral nervous system only. Cajal, however, used the term plasticity to reference his findings of degeneration and regeneration in the adult brain (a part of the central nervous system). This was controversial, with some like Walther Spielmeyer and Max Bielschowsky arguing that the CNS cannot produce new cells.

The term has since been broadly applied:

Given the central importance of neuroplasticity, an outsider would be forgiven for assuming that it was well defined and that a basic and universal framework served to direct current and future hypotheses and experimentation. Sadly, however, this is not the case. While many neuroscientists use the word neuroplasticity as an umbrella term it means different things to different researchers in different subfields ... In brief, a mutually agreed-upon framework does not appear to exist.

=== Research and discovery ===
In 1923, Karl Lashley conducted experiments on rhesus monkeys that demonstrated changes in neuronal pathways, which he concluded were evidence of plasticity. Despite this, and other research that suggested plasticity, neuroscientists did not widely accept the idea of neuroplasticity.

Inspired by work from Nicolas Rashevsky, in 1943, McCulloch and Pitts proposed the artificial neuron, with a learning rule, whereby new synapses are produced when neurons fire simultaneously. This is then extensively discussed in The organization of behavior (Hebb, 1949) and is now known as Hebbian learning.

In 1945, Justo Gonzalo concluded from his research on brain dynamics, that, contrary to the activity of the projection areas, the "central" cortical mass (more or less equidistant from the visual, tactile and auditive projection areas), would be a "maneuvering mass", rather unspecific or multisensory, with capacity to increase neural excitability and re-organize the activity by means of plasticity properties. He gives as a first example of adaptation, to see upright with reversing glasses in the Stratton experiment, and specially, several first-hand brain injuries cases in which he observed dynamic and adaptive properties in their disorders, in particular in the inverted perception disorder [e.g., see pp 260–62 Vol. I (1945), p 696 Vol. II (1950)]. He stated that a sensory signal in a projection area would be only an inverted and constricted outline that would be magnified due to the increase in recruited cerebral mass, and re-inverted due to some effect of brain plasticity, in more central areas, following a spiral growth.

Marian Diamond of the University of California, Berkeley, produced the first scientific evidence of anatomical brain plasticity, publishing her research in 1964.

Other significant evidence was produced in the 1960s and after, notably from scientists including Paul Bach-y-Rita, Michael Merzenich along with Jon Kaas, as well as several others. An attempt to describe the mechanisms of neuroplasticity, an early version of the computational theory of mind derived from Hebb's work, was put forward by Peter Putnam and Robert W. Fuller in that time.

In the 1960s, Paul Bach-y-Rita invented a device that was tested on a small number of people, and involved a person sitting in a chair, embedded in which were nubs that were made to vibrate in ways that translated images received in a camera, allowing a form of vision via sensory substitution.

Studies in people recovering from stroke also provided support for neuroplasticity, as regions of the brain that remained healthy could sometimes take over, at least in part, functions that had been destroyed; Shepherd Ivory Franz did work in this area.

Eleanor Maguire documented changes in hippocampal structure associated with acquiring the knowledge of London's layout in local taxi drivers. A redistribution of grey matter was indicated in London Taxi Drivers compared to controls. This work on hippocampal plasticity not only interested scientists, but also engaged the public and media worldwide.

Michael Merzenich is a neuroscientist who has been one of the pioneers of neuroplasticity for over three decades. He has made some of "the most ambitious claims for the field – that brain exercises may be as useful as drugs to treat diseases as severe as schizophrenia – that plasticity exists from cradle to the grave, and that radical improvements in cognitive functioning – how we learn, think, perceive, and remember are possible even in the elderly." Merzenich's work was affected by a crucial discovery made by David Hubel and Torsten Wiesel in their work with kittens. The experiment involved sewing one eye shut and recording the cortical brain maps. Hubel and Wiesel saw that the portion of the kitten's brain associated with the shut eye was not idle, as expected. Instead, it processed visual information from the open eye. It was "…as though the brain didn't want to waste any 'cortical real estate' and had found a way to rewire itself."

This implied neuroplasticity during the critical period. However, Merzenich argued that neuroplasticity could occur beyond the critical period. His first encounter with adult plasticity came when he was engaged in a postdoctoral study with Clinton Woosley. The experiment was based on observation of what occurred in the brain when one peripheral nerve was cut and subsequently regenerated. The two scientists micromapped the hand maps of monkey brains before and after cutting a peripheral nerve and sewing the ends together. Afterwards, the hand map in the brain that they expected to be jumbled was nearly normal. This was a substantial breakthrough. Merzenich asserted that, "If the brain map could normalize its structure in response to abnormal input, the prevailing view that we are born with a hardwired system had to be wrong. The brain had to be plastic." Merzenich received the 2016 Kavli Prize in Neuroscience "for the discovery of mechanisms that allow experience and neural activity to remodel brain function."

== Neurobiology ==
There are different ideas and theories on what biological processes allow for neuroplasticity to occur. The core of this phenomenon is based upon synapses and how connections between them change based on neuron functioning. It is widely agreed upon that neuroplasticity takes on many forms, as it is a result of a variety of pathways. These pathways, mainly signaling cascades, allow for gene expression alterations that lead to neuronal changes, and thus neuroplasticity.

History of Neurobiology has been proven to be loosely documented, however there are some underlying findings that shows it exists. The neural circuit that carries visual information from the eyes to the brain, named the visual cortical sensory pathway shows some truth behind the brain and biological processes. Studies have shown that individual respond to ever changing stimuli in the outside world connects to the brains plasticity, opening the doors for studies in neurobiology.

There are a number of other factors that are thought to play a role in the biological processes underlying the changing of neural networks in the brain. Some of these factors include synapse regulation via phosphorylation, the role of inflammation and inflammatory cytokines, proteins such as Bcl-2 proteins and neutrophorins, energy production via mitochondria, and acetylcholine.

JT Wall and J Xu have traced the mechanisms underlying neuroplasticity. Re-organization is not cortically emergent, but occurs at every level in the processing hierarchy; this produces the map changes observed in the cerebral cortex.

Drugs, stress, anxiety, and depression are large factors that altered gene expressions especially since the changes are long-lasting. Although neuroplasticity is referred as the brain's ability to adapt and change over time, the environment that a person lives in affects this. Because plasticity happens in reward and stress related sections of the brain, seeking out that reinforcing stimuli that are advantaged to survival and avoid potentially dangerous situations. "However, drugs of abuse can hijack these circuits and induce abnormally persistent drug reward-related memories and in the extreme addiction (Hyman et al, 2006—review of the memory forming processes associated with addiction)" (McClung, C. A., & Nestler, E. J. ). Similarly to physical or emotional stress, long time exposure to this can lead to depression and/or other mood disorders. Of course there are treatments for drug abuse, and medications that in a way "reverse" the effects of depression.

Focusing on the molecular/cellular level of neuroplasticity biology, there are polyadenylation factors that affect it. This is when mRNAS travel to synapses where they are translated and partake in synaptic remodeling at those locations. According to the journal Neuroplasticity Mediated by Altered Gene Expressions authored by Colleen A McClung and Eric J Nesler they explain, "Several studies have identified mRNA-binding proteins, such as the cytoplasmic polyadenylation element-binding protein (CPEB) and cleavage and polyadenylation specificity factor that regulate mRNA translation at the synapse (Wu et al, 1998)" (McClung, Nestler). Due to this CPEB homologue lacks long term memory because the drosophila carries a mutation in it. Conformational change comes through chronic stimulation at the active state of CPEB that leads to long lasting synaptic changes.

Neurotrophins are strong molecular mediators of synaptic plasticity. It plays an important role in synapses, the brain derived neurotrophic factor (BDNF) is the main function in adults. It's a synaptic plasticity regulator; the structural and functional effects range from short to long-term lasting or excitatory or inhibitory synapses in multiple brain sections. Having a deficit in BDNF is shown to contribute to the following illnesses/diseases: Huntington's disease, Alzheimer's disease, and depression. (N.V. Gulyaeva).

== Types ==
Christopher Shaw and Jill McEachern (eds) in "Toward a theory of Neuroplasticity", state that there is no all-inclusive theory that overarches different frameworks and systems in the study of neuroplasticity. However, researchers often describe neuroplasticity as "the ability to make adaptive changes related to the structure and function of the nervous system." Correspondingly, two types of neuroplasticity are often discussed: structural neuroplasticity and functional neuroplasticity.

=== Structural neuroplasticity ===
Structural Neuroplasticity (also referred to as Structural Plasticity) can be defined as the brain's ability to physically change its anatomical structure through alterations and/or new developments as a result of external stimuli or damage. This biological occurrence typically happens when changes are made to existing neural circuits (Ex. The creation of new dendritic spines), axonal sprouting, and neurogenesis (the creation of new neurons). The relevance behind structural neuroplasticity can be traced back to the importance of the generalities of neuroplasticity. Neuroplasticity is important because it's a biological occurrence that allows the brain to adapt to the influx of new information that is gained during human development; typically accomplished through the reorganization of its structure, functions, and/or connections. These changes allow humans to adapt to everyday life and play an important role in learning and memory. Structural neuroplasticity accomplishes this objective by focusing on altering and creating new anatomical brain structures through the process of neurogenesis. Recent research suggests that structural neuroplasticity can also be enhanced through regular physical activity. Exercise has been associated with increased neurogenesis in the hippocampus, improvements in dendritic branching, and changes in gray matter volume in brain regions involved in learning and memory. Studies have also shown that physical activity may strengthen neural connections and support cognitive function across the lifespan. These findings suggest that lifestyle factors can play an important role in promoting structural changes in the brain.

The changes of grey matter proportion or the synaptic strength in the brain are considered as examples of structural neuroplasticity. This type of neuroplasticity often studies the effect of various internal or external stimuli on the brain's anatomical reorganization. New neurons are constantly produced and integrated into the central nervous system based on this type of neuroplasticity. Researchers nowadays use multiple cross-sectional imaging methods (i.e. magnetic resonance imaging (MRI), computerized tomography (CT)) to study the structural alterations of the human brains. Structural neuroplasticity is currently investigated more within the field of neuroscience in current academia. Adult neurogenesis "has not been convincingly demonstrated in humans". However, some new neurons can be formed in the subgranular zone of the hippocampal dentate gyrus & the subventricular zone of the lateral ventricles and has been found to play an important role in emotional and cognitive functions such as spatial learning, memory, pattern separation, & mood regulation. It has also been shown that there are endogenous mechanisms (found in the adult brain) to aid in brain repair when damage to the brain has occurred, another reason why structural neuroplasticity is important.

=== Functional neuroplasticity ===
Functional plasticity refers to the brain's ability to alter and adapt the functional properties of network of neurons. It can occur in four known ways namely:

1. homologous area adaptation
2. map expansion
3. cross-model reassignment
4. compensatory masquerade.

==== Homologous area adaptation ====
Homologous area adaptation is the assumption of a particular cognitive process by a homologous region in the opposite hemisphere. For instance, through homologous area adaptation a cognitive task is shifted from a damaged part of the brain to its homologous area in opposite side of the brain. Homologous area adaptation is a type of functional neuroplasticity that occur usually in children rather than adults.

==== Map expansion ====
In map expansion, cortical maps related to particular cognitive tasks expand due to frequent exposure to stimuli. Map expansion has been proven through experiments performed in relation to the study: experiment on effect of frequent stimulus on functional connectivity of the brain was observed in individuals learning spatial routes.

==== Cross-model reassignment ====
Cross-model reassignment involves reception of novel input signals to a brain region which has been stripped of its default input.

These modals have the ability to be flexible and allow the changes of environment, even with the loss of its original input.

It allows the ability of Neuroplasticity to be seen down to the molecular, cellular and, systems level because of the behavioral change by the associated reorganization of neural systems.

A study of roundworms, that only have 302 neurons has demonstrated this type of Neuroplasticity. When losing the ability to touch, it was seen that the sense of smell improved in order to combat the loss of another input. It shows how the cross-modal reassignment is implemented and also depends on the activity's of certain neurons. Additionally, it showed how plasticity is biologically built into the nervous system.

==== Compensatory masquerade ====
Functional plasticity through compensatory masquerade occurs using different cognitive processes for an already established cognitive task when the initial process cannot be followed due to impairment.

Changes in the brain associated with functional neuroplasticity can occur in response to two different types of events:

- previous activity (activity-dependent plasticity) to acquire memory or
- in response to malfunction or damage of neurons (maladaptive plasticity) to compensate a pathological event

In the latter case the functions from one part of the brain transfer to another part of the brain based on the demand to produce recovery of behavioral or physiological processes. Regarding physiological forms of activity-dependent plasticity, those involving synapses are referred to as synaptic plasticity. The strengthening or weakening of synapses that results in an increase or decrease of firing rate of the neurons are called long-term potentiation (LTP) and long-term depression (LTD), respectively, and they are considered as examples of synaptic plasticity that are associated with memory. The cerebellum is a typical structure with combinations of LTP/LTD and redundancy within the circuitry, allowing plasticity at several sites. More recently it has become clearer that synaptic plasticity can be complemented by another form of activity-dependent plasticity involving the intrinsic excitability of neurons, which is referred to as intrinsic plasticity. This, as opposed to homeostatic plasticity does not necessarily maintain the overall activity of a neuron within a network but contributes to encoding memories. Also, many studies have indicated functional neuroplasticity in the level of brain networks, where training alters the strength of functional connections. Although a recent study discusses that these observed changes should not directly relate to neuroplasticity, since they may root in the systematic requirement of the brain network for reorganization.

N.V. Gulyaeva gives out more types of how plasticity is affected in the article Molecular Mechanisms of Neuroplasticity, "Homeostatic synaptic plasticity is maintained by a set of negative-feedback mechanisms that are used by neurons to maintain activity within a functional range" (Gulyaeva). Additionally, proinflammatory cytokines that are molecules associated with the peripheral immune system, contributes to the modulation of homeostatic synaptic plasticity. Neuroinflammation is a common link in neurological and mind diseases, microglia are involved in representing particularly plastic cells that can be moved from their resting state by a number of factors.

== Applications and examples ==
The adult brain is not entirely "hard-wired" with fixed neuronal circuits. There are many instances of cortical and subcortical rewiring of neuronal circuits in response to training as well as in response to injury.

There is ample evidence for the active, experience-dependent re-organization of the synaptic networks of the brain involving multiple inter-related structures including the cerebral cortex. The specific details of how this process occurs at the molecular and ultrastructural levels are topics of active neuroscience research. The way experience can influence the synaptic organization of the brain is also the basis for a number of theories of brain function including the general theory of mind and neural Darwinism. The concept of neuroplasticity is also central to theories of memory and learning that are associated with experience-driven alteration of synaptic structure and function in studies of classical conditioning in invertebrate animal models such as Aplysia.

There is evidence that neurogenesis (birth of brain cells) occurs in the adult, rodent brain—and such changes can persist well into old age. The evidence for neurogenesis is mainly restricted to the hippocampus and olfactory bulb, but research has revealed that other parts of the brain, including the cerebellum, may be involved as well. However, the degree of rewiring induced by the integration of new neurons in the established circuits is not known, and such rewiring may well be functionally redundant.

=== Addiction ===
Addiction is a state characterized by compulsive engagement in rewarding stimuli, despite adverse consequences. The process of developing an addiction occurs through instrumental learning, which is otherwise known as operant conditioning.

Neuroscientists believe that drug addicts’ behavior is a direct correlation to some physiological change in their brain, caused by using drugs. This view believes there is a bodily function in the brain causing the addiction. This is brought on by a change in the brain caused by brain damage or adaptation from chronic drug use.

In humans, addiction is diagnosed according to diagnostic models such as the Diagnostic and Statistical Manual of Mental Disorders, through observed behaviors. There has been significant advancement in understanding the structural changes that occur in parts of the brain involved in the reward pathway (mesolimbic system) that underlies addiction. Most research has focused on two portions of the brain: the ventral tegmental area, (VTA) and the nucleus accumbens (NAc).

The VTA is the portion of the mesolimbic system responsible for spreading dopamine to the whole system. The VTA is stimulated by ″rewarding experiences″. The release of dopamine by the VTA induces pleasure, thus reinforcing behaviors that lead to the reward. Drugs of abuse increase the VTA's ability to project dopamine to the rest of the reward circuit. These structural changes only last 7–10 days, however, indicating that the VTA cannot be the only part of the brain that is affected by drug use, and changed during the development of addiction.

The nucleus accumbens (NAc) plays an essential part in the formation of addiction. Almost every drug with addictive potential induces the release of dopamine into the NAc. In contrast to the VTA, the NAc shows long-term structural changes. Drugs of abuse weaken the connections within the NAc after habitual use, as well as after use then withdrawal.

=== Treatment of brain damage ===
A surprising consequence of neuroplasticity is that the brain activity associated with a given function can be transferred to a different location; this can result from normal experience and also occurs in the process of recovery from brain injury. Neuroplasticity is the fundamental issue that supports the scientific basis for treatment of acquired brain injury with goal-directed experiential therapeutic programs in the context of rehabilitation approaches to the functional consequences of the injury.

Neuroplasticity is gaining popularity as a theory that, at least in part, explains improvements in functional outcomes with physical therapy post-stroke. Rehabilitation techniques that are supported by evidence which suggest cortical reorganization as the mechanism of change include constraint-induced movement therapy, functional electrical stimulation, treadmill training with body-weight support, and virtual reality therapy. Robot assisted therapy is an emerging technique, which is also hypothesized to work by way of neuroplasticity, though there is currently insufficient evidence to determine the exact mechanisms of change when using this method.

One group has developed a treatment that includes increased levels of progesterone injections in brain-injured patients. "Administration of progesterone after traumatic brain injury (TBI) and stroke reduces edema, inflammation, and neuronal cell death, and enhances spatial reference memory and sensory-motor recovery." In a clinical trial, a group of severely injured patients had a 60% reduction in mortality after three days of progesterone injections. However, a study published in the New England Journal of Medicine in 2014 detailing the results of a multi-center NIH-funded phase III clinical trial of 882 patients found that treatment of acute traumatic brain injury with the hormone progesterone provides no significant benefit to patients when compared with placebo.

=== Binocular vision ===
For decades, researchers assumed that humans had to acquire binocular vision, in particular stereopsis, in early childhood or they would never gain it. In recent years, however, successful improvements in persons with amblyopia, convergence insufficiency or other stereo vision anomalies have become prime examples of neuroplasticity; binocular vision improvements and stereopsis recovery are now active areas of scientific and clinical research.

=== Phantom limbs ===
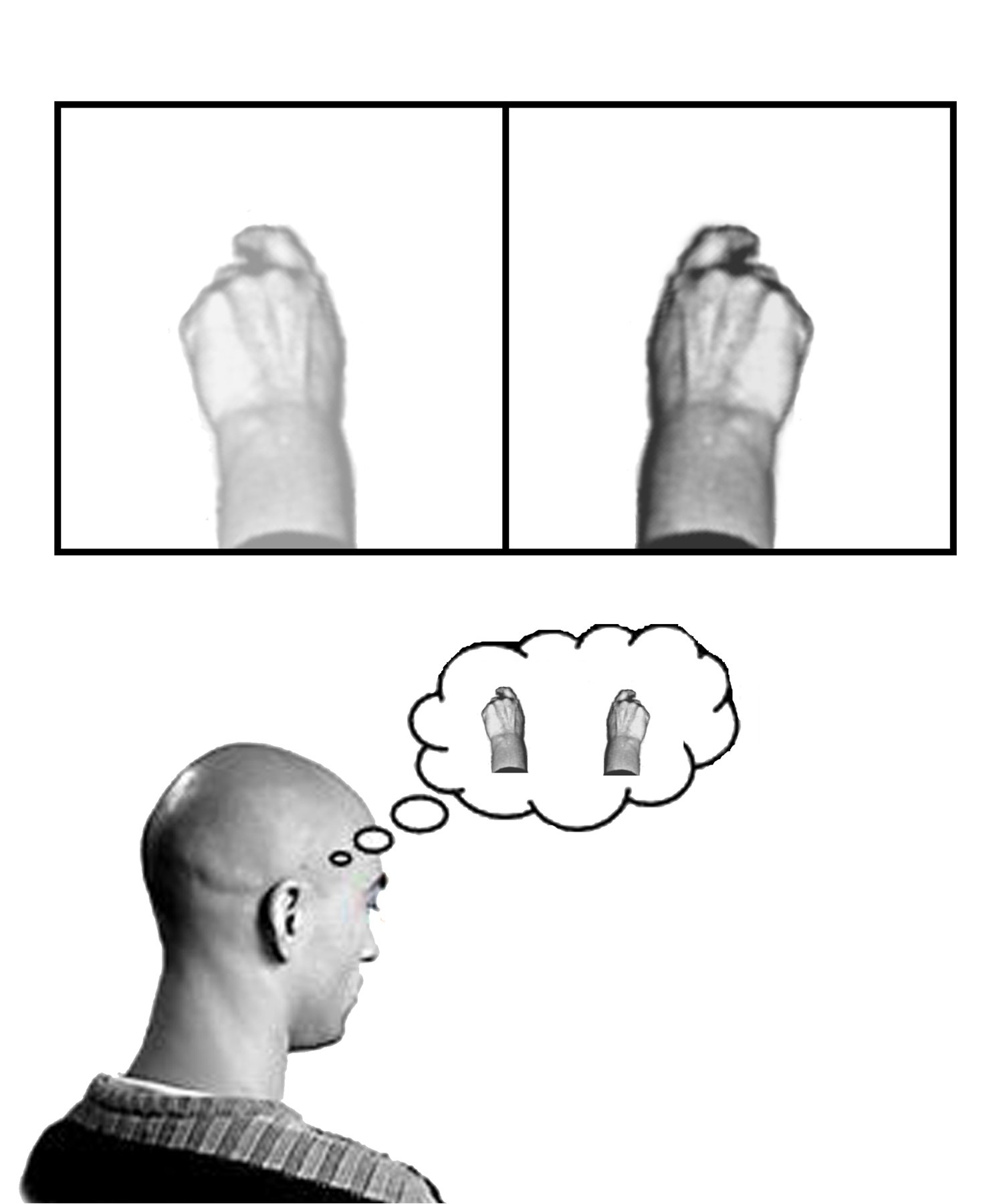
A diagrammatic explanation of the mirror box. The patient places the intact limb into one side of the box (in this case the right hand) and the amputated limb into the other side. Due to the mirror, the patient sees a reflection of the intact hand where the missing limb would be (indicated in lower contrast). The patient thus receives artificial visual feedback that the "resurrected" limb is now moving when they move the good hand.

In the phenomenon of phantom limb sensation, a person continues to feel pain or sensation within a part of their body that has been amputated. This is strangely common, occurring in 60–80% of amputees. An explanation for this is based on the concept of neuroplasticity, as the cortical maps of the removed limbs are believed to have become engaged with the area around them in the postcentral gyrus. This results in activity within the surrounding area of the cortex being misinterpreted by the area of the cortex formerly responsible for the amputated limb.

The relationship between phantom limb sensation and neuroplasticity is a complex one. In the early 1990s V.S. Ramachandran theorized that phantom limbs were the result of cortical remapping. However, in 1995 Herta Flor and her colleagues demonstrated that cortical remapping occurs only in patients who have phantom pain. Her research showed that phantom limb pain (rather than referred sensations) was the perceptual correlate of cortical reorganization. This phenomenon is sometimes referred to as maladaptive plasticity.

In 2009, Lorimer Moseley and Peter Brugger carried out an experiment in which they encouraged arm amputee subjects to use visual imagery to contort their phantom limbs into impossible configurations. Four of the seven subjects succeeded in performing impossible movements of the phantom limb. This experiment suggests that the subjects had modified the neural representation of their phantom limbs and generated the motor commands needed to execute impossible movements in the absence of feedback from the body.

=== Chronic pain ===
Individuals who have chronic pain experience prolonged pain at sites that may have been previously injured, yet are otherwise currently healthy. This phenomenon is related to neuroplasticity due to a maladaptive reorganization of the nervous system, both peripherally and centrally. During the period of tissue damage, noxious stimuli and inflammation cause an elevation of nociceptive input from the periphery to the central nervous system. Prolonged nociception from the periphery then elicits a neuroplastic response at the cortical level to change its somatotopic organization for the painful site, inducing central sensitization. For instance, individuals experiencing complex regional pain syndrome demonstrate a diminished cortical somatotopic representation of the hand contralaterally as well as a decreased spacing between the hand and the mouth. Additionally, chronic pain has been reported to significantly reduce the volume of grey matter throughout the brain, particularly at the prefrontal cortex and right thalamus. However, following treatment, these abnormalities in cortical reorganization and grey matter volume are resolved, as well as their symptoms. Similar results have been reported for phantom limb pain, chronic low back pain and carpal tunnel syndrome.

Chronic pain and neuroplasticity can alter cognition and impair learning, attention, memory, and decision making. Clinical studies have shown that chronic pain remodels the brain both structurally (e.g. gray matter loss) and functionally. Pain is a complex, multidimensional condition that activates several biological processes when an injury or threat has occurred. Remodeling begins when there is an increase in neuroinflammation, an imbalance in neurotransmitters (GABA, glutamate, dopamine) and disruption in synaptic plasticity. When the brain undergoes reorganization, there is a transition that occurs. Pain switches from the sensory region of the brain to the emotional and the limbic regions where pain is amplified and becomes chronic. The areas of the brain that undergo structural and functional changes in the corticolimbic system are: The prefrontal cortex, the anterior cingulate cortex, the amygdala, and the hippocampus. When these structures are changed because of neuroplasticity, it causes cognitive dysfunction. Chronic pain and neuroplasticity impairs learning, attention, memory, and decision making and can cause adverse emotions, such as depression and anxiety.

=== Meditation ===
A number of studies have linked meditation practice to differences in cortical thickness or density of gray matter. One of the most well-known studies to demonstrate this was led by Sara Lazar, from Harvard University, in 2000. Richard Davidson, a neuroscientist at the University of Wisconsin, has led experiments in collaboration with the Dalai Lama on effects of meditation on the brain. His results suggest that meditation may lead to change in the physical structure of brain regions associated with attention, anxiety, depression, fear, anger, and compassion as well as the ability of the body to heal itself.

=== Artistic engagement and art therapy ===
There is substantial evidence that artistic engagement in a therapeutic environment can create changes in neural network connections as well as increase cognitive flexibility. In one 2013 study, researchers found evidence that long-term, habitual artistic training (e.g. musical instrument practice, purposeful painting, etc.) can "macroscopically imprint a neural network system of spontaneous activity in which the related brain regions become functionally and topologically modularized in both domain-general and domain-specific manners". In simple terms, brains repeatedly exposed to artistic training over long periods develop adaptations to make such activity both easier and more likely to spontaneously occur.

Some researchers and academics have suggested that artistic engagement has substantially altered the human brain throughout our evolutionary history. D.W Zaidel, adjunct professor of behavioral neuroscience and contributor at VAGA, has written that "evolutionary theory links the symbolic nature of art to critical pivotal brain changes in Homo sapiens supporting increased development of language and hierarchical social grouping".

=== Music therapy ===
There is evidence that engaging in music-supported therapy can improve neuroplasticity in patients who are recovering from brain injuries. Music-supported therapy can be used for patients that are undergoing stroke rehabilitation where a one-month study of stroke patients participating in music-supported therapy showed a significant improvement in motor control in their affected hand. Another finding was the examination of grey matter volume of adults developing brain atrophy and cognitive decline where playing a musical instrument, such as the piano, or listening to music can increase grey matter volume in areas such as the caudate nucleus, Rolandic operculum, and cerebellum. Evidence also suggests that music-supported therapy can improve cognitive performance, well-being, and social behavior in patients who are recovering from damage to the orbitofrontal cortex (OFC) and recovering from mild traumatic brain injury. Neuroimaging post music-supported therapy revealed functional changes in OFC networks, with improvements observed in both task-based and resting-state fMRI analyses.

Beyond clinical rehabilitation, music has been shown to induce neuroplastic changes in healthy individuals through long-term training and repeated exposure. Studies comparing musicians and non-musicians have demonstrated structural and functional brain differences associated with musical practice, particularly when training begins early in life.[98] Musicians often exhibit increased gray and white matter volume in motor, auditory, and cerebellar regions, reflecting adaptations related to fine motor control, auditory processing, and timing. Evidence of cortical remapping has also been observed, such as enlarged cortical representations of the fingers most frequently used during instrument performance.

Music training strongly affects the auditory system, with musicians showing enhanced activation and structural differences in primary and secondary auditory cortices involved in processing pitch, rhythm, and melody. Functional changes have been observed not only at the cortical level but also in subcortical structures, including the brainstem, where musicians demonstrate faster and stronger neural responses to sound. Across the lifespan, sustained musical engagement has been associated with reduced age-related decline in certain brain regions and a lower risk of cognitive impairment, suggesting that music-related neuroplasticity may contribute to long-term brain health.

=== Fitness and exercise ===
Aerobic exercise increases the production of neurotrophic factors (compounds that promote growth or survival of neurons), such as brain-derived neurotrophic factor (BDNF), insulin-like growth factor 1 (IGF-1), and vascular endothelial growth factor (VEGF). Exercise-induced effects on the hippocampus are associated with measurable improvements in spatial memory. Consistent aerobic exercise over a period of several months induces marked clinically significant improvements in executive function (i.e., the "cognitive control" of behavior) and increased gray matter volume in multiple brain regions, particularly those that give rise to cognitive control. The brain structures that show the greatest improvements in gray matter volume in response to aerobic exercise are the prefrontal cortex and hippocampus; moderate improvements are seen in the anterior cingulate cortex, parietal cortex, cerebellum, caudate nucleus, and nucleus accumbens. Higher physical fitness scores (measured by VO_{2} max) are associated with better executive function, faster processing speed, and greater volume of the hippocampus, caudate nucleus, and nucleus accumbens.

=== Deafness and loss of hearing ===
Due to hearing loss, the auditory cortex and other association areas of the brain in deaf and/or hard of hearing people undergo compensatory plasticity. The auditory cortex usually reserved for processing auditory information in hearing people now is redirected to serve other functions, especially for vision and somatosensation.

Deaf individuals have enhanced peripheral visual attention, better motion change but not color change detection ability in visual tasks, more effective visual search, and faster response time for visual targets compared to hearing individuals. Altered visual processing in deaf people is often found to be associated with the repurposing of other brain areas including primary auditory cortex, posterior parietal association cortex (PPAC), and anterior cingulate cortex (ACC). A review by Bavelier et al. (2006) summarizes many aspects on the topic of visual ability comparison between deaf and hearing individuals.

Brain areas that serve a function in auditory processing repurpose to process somatosensory information in congenitally deaf people. They have higher sensitivity in detecting frequency change in vibration above threshold and higher and more widespread activation in auditory cortex under somatosensory stimulation. However, speeded response for somatosensory stimuli is not found in deaf adults.

==== Cochlear implant ====
Neuroplasticity is involved in the development of sensory function. The brain is born immature and then adapts to sensory inputs after birth. In the auditory system, congenital hearing loss, a rather frequent inborn condition affecting 1 of 1000 newborns, has been shown to affect auditory development, and implantation of a sensory prostheses activating the auditory system has prevented the deficits and induced functional maturation of the auditory system. Due to a sensitive period for plasticity, there is also a sensitive period for such intervention within the first 2–4 years of life. Consequently, in prelingually deaf children, early cochlear implantation, as a rule, allows the children to learn the mother language and acquire acoustic communication.

=== Blindness ===
Due to vision loss, the visual cortex in blind people may undergo cross-modal plasticity, and therefore other senses may have enhanced abilities. Or the opposite could occur, with the lack of visual input weakening the development of other sensory systems. One study suggests that the right posterior middle temporal gyrus and superior occipital gyrus reveal more activation in the blind than in the sighted people during a sound-moving detection task. Several studies support the latter idea and found weakened ability in audio distance evaluation, proprioceptive reproduction, threshold for visual bisection, and judging minimum audible angle.

==== Human echolocation ====
Human echolocation is a learned ability for humans to sense their environment from echoes. This ability is used by some blind people to navigate their environment and sense their surroundings in detail. Studies in 2010 and 2011 using functional magnetic resonance imaging techniques have shown that parts of the brain associated with visual processing are adapted for the new skill of echolocation. Studies with blind patients, for example, suggest that the click-echoes heard by these patients were processed by brain regions devoted to vision rather than audition.

=== Attention deficit hyperactivity disorder ===
Reviews of MRI and electroencephalography (EEG) studies on individuals with ADHD suggest that the long-term treatment of ADHD with stimulants, such as amphetamine or methylphenidate, decreases abnormalities in brain structure and function found in subjects with ADHD, and improves function in several parts of the brain, such as the right caudate nucleus of the basal ganglia, left ventrolateral prefrontal cortex (VLPFC), and superior temporal gyrus.

In addition to pharmacological treatment, non-pharmacological interventions that leverage neuroplasticity have been proposed as potential approaches for managing ADHD symptoms. Cognitive training and other behavioral therapies aim to improve attention, self-regulation, and impulse control by promoting functional and structural changes in neural circuits associated with executive function. Computerized cognitive training programs have been shown to target underdeveloped neural networks in individuals with ADHD, leading to improvements in attention and working memory through repeated stimulation of specific brain regions. These interventions may produce longer-term neuroplastic changes that overlap with brain areas affected by stimulant medications, suggesting that neuroplasticity-based therapies could complement or, in some cases, reduce reliance on pharmacological treatment.

=== In early child development ===
Neuroplasticity is most active in childhood as a part of normal human development, and can also be seen as an especially important mechanism for children in terms of risk and resiliency. Trauma is considered a great risk as it negatively affects many areas of the brain and puts a strain on the sympathetic nervous system from constant activation. Trauma thus alters the brain's connections such that children who have experienced trauma may be hyper vigilant or overly aroused. However, a child's brain can cope with these adverse effects through the actions of neuroplasticity.

Neuroplasticity is shown in four different categories in children and covering a wide variety of neuronal functioning. These four types include impaired, excessive, adaptive, and plasticity.

There are many examples of neuroplasticity in human development. For example, Justine Ker and Stephen Nelson looked at the effects of musical training on neuroplasticity, and found that musical training can contribute to experience dependent structural plasticity. This is when changes in the brain occur based on experiences that are unique to an individual. Examples of this are learning multiple languages, playing a sport, doing theatre, etc. A study done by Hyde in 2009, showed that changes in the brain of children could be seen in as little as 15 months of musical training. Ker and Nelson suggest this degree of plasticity in the brains of children can "help provide a form of intervention for children... with developmental disorders and neurological diseases."

=== In animals ===
In a single lifespan, individuals of an animal species may encounter various changes in brain morphology. Many of these differences are caused by the release of hormones in the brain; others are the product of evolutionary factors or developmental stages. Some changes occur seasonally in species to enhance or generate response behaviors.

==== Seasonal brain changes ====
Changing brain behavior and morphology to suit other seasonal behaviors is relatively common in animals. These changes can improve the chances of mating during breeding season. Examples of seasonal brain morphology change can be found within many classes and species.

Within the class Aves, black-capped chickadees experience an increase in the volume of their hippocampus and strength of neural connections to the hippocampus during fall months. These morphological changes within the hippocampus which are related to spatial memory are not limited to birds, as they can also be observed in rodents and amphibians. In songbirds, many song control nuclei in the brain increase in size during mating season. Among birds, changes in brain morphology to influence song patterns, frequency, and volume are common. Gonadotropin-releasing hormone (GnRH) immunoreactivity, or the reception of the hormone, is lowered in European starlings exposed to longer periods of light during the day.

The California sea hare, a gastropod, has more successful inhibition of egg-laying hormones outside of mating season due to increased effectiveness of inhibitors in the brain. Changes to the inhibitory nature of regions of the brain can also be found in humans and other mammals. In the amphibian Bufo japonicus, part of the amygdala is larger before breeding and during hibernation than it is after breeding.

Seasonal brain variation occurs within many mammals. Part of the hypothalamus of the common ewe is more receptive to GnRH during breeding season than at other times of the year. Humans experience a change in the "size of the hypothalamic suprachiasmatic nucleus and vasopressin-immunoreactive neurons within it" during the fall, when these parts are larger. In the spring, both reduce in size.

==== Traumatic brain injury research ====
A group of scientists found that if a small stroke (an infarction) is induced by obstruction of blood flow to a portion of a monkey's motor cortex, the part of the body that responds by movement moves when areas adjacent to the damaged brain area are stimulated. In one study, intracortical microstimulation (ICMS) mapping techniques were used in nine normal monkeys. Some underwent ischemic-infarction procedures and the others, ICMS procedures. The monkeys with ischemic infarctions retained more finger flexion during food retrieval and after several months this deficit returned to preoperative levels. With respect to the distal forelimb representation, "postinfarction mapping procedures revealed that movement representations underwent reorganization throughout the adjacent, undamaged cortex." Understanding of interaction between the damaged and undamaged areas provides a basis for better treatment plans in stroke patients. Current research includes the tracking of changes that occur in the motor areas of the cerebral cortex as a result of a stroke. Thus, events that occur in the reorganization process of the brain can be ascertained. The treatment plans that may enhance recovery from strokes, such as physiotherapy, pharmacotherapy, and electrical-stimulation therapy, are also being studied.

Jon Kaas, a professor at Vanderbilt University, has been able to show "how somatosensory area 3b and ventroposterior (VP) nucleus of the thalamus are affected by longstanding unilateral dorsal-column lesions at cervical levels in macaque monkeys." Adult brains have the ability to change as a result of injury but the extent of the reorganization depends on the extent of the injury. His recent research focuses on the somatosensory system, which involves a sense of the body and its movements using many senses. Usually, damage of the somatosensory cortex results in impairment of the body perception. Kaas' research project is focused on how these systems (somatosensory, cognitive, motor systems) respond with plastic changes resulting from injury.

One recent study of neuroplasticity involves work done by a team of doctors and researchers at Emory University, specifically Donald Stein and David Wright. This is the first treatment in 40 years that has significant results in treating traumatic brain injuries while also incurring no known side effects and being cheap to administer. Stein noticed that female mice seemed to recover from brain injuries better than male mice, and that at certain points in the estrus cycle, females recovered even better. This difference may be attributed to different levels of progesterone, with higher levels of progesterone leading to the faster recovery from brain injury in mice. However, clinical trials showed progesterone offers no significant benefit for traumatic brain injury in human patients.

=== Aging ===
Transcriptional profiling of the frontal cortex of persons ranging from 26 to 106 years of age defined a set of genes with reduced expression after age 40, and especially after age 70. Genes that play central roles in synaptic plasticity were the most significantly affected by age, generally showing reduced expression over time. There was also a marked increase in cortical DNA damage, likely oxidative DNA damage, in gene promoters with aging.

Reactive oxygen species appear to have a significant role in the regulation of synaptic plasticity and cognitive function. However age-related increases in reactive oxygen species may also lead to impairments in these functions.

Furthermore, current research has shown that Adult neurogenesis is occurring in human brains. The new revolution of thymidine analog Brad and other antibodies were introduced in order to label newborn neurons, this has caused the indications of new neurons in adult hippocampus neurogenesis. This has caused some hope for brain regions to be repaired, however, many illnesses, like Parkinson's, persist.

=== Multilingualism ===
There is a beneficial effect of multilingualism on people's behavior and cognition. Numerous studies have shown that people who study more than one language have better cognitive functions and flexibilities than people who only speak one language. Bilinguals are found to have longer attention spans, stronger organization and analyzation skills, and a better theory of mind than monolinguals. Researchers have found that the effect of multilingualism on better cognition is due to neuroplasticity.

In one prominent study, neurolinguists used a voxel-based morphometry (VBM) method to visualize the structural plasticity of brains in healthy monolinguals and bilinguals. They first investigated the differences in density of grey and white matter between two groups and found the relationship between brain structure and age of language acquisition. The results showed that grey-matter density in the inferior parietal cortex for multilinguals were significantly greater than monolinguals. The researchers also found that early bilinguals had a greater density of grey matter relative to late bilinguals in the same region. The inferior parietal cortex is a brain region highly associated with the language learning, which corresponds to the VBM result of the study.

Recent studies have also found that learning multiple languages not only re-structures the brain but also boosts brain's capacity for plasticity. A recent study found that multilingualism not only affects the grey matter but also white matter of the brain. White matter is made up of myelinated axons that is greatly associated with learning and communication. Neurolinguists used a diffusion tensor imaging (DTI) scanning method to determine the white matter intensity between monolinguals and bilinguals. Increased myelinations in white matter tracts were found in bilingual individuals who actively used both languages in everyday life. The demand of handling more than one language requires more efficient connectivity within the brain, which resulted in greater white matter density for multilinguals.

While it is still debated whether these changes in brain are result of genetic disposition or environmental demands, many evidences suggest that environmental, social experience in early multilinguals affect the structural and functional reorganization in the brain.

=== Novel treatments of depression ===
Historically, the monoamine imbalance hypothesis of depression played a dominant role in psychiatry and drug development. However, while traditional antidepressants cause a quick increase in noradrenaline, serotonin, or dopamine, there is a significant delay in their clinical effect and often an inadequate treatment response. As neuroscientists pursued this avenue of research, clinical and preclinical data across multiple modalities began to converge on pathways involved in neuroplasticity. They found a strong inverse relationship between the number of synapses and severity of depression symptoms and discovered that in addition to their neurotransmitter effect, traditional antidepressants improved neuroplasticity but over a significantly protracted time course of weeks or months. The search for faster acting antidepressants found success in the pursuit of ketamine, a well-known anesthetic agent, that was found to have potent anti-depressant effects after a single infusion due to its capacity to rapidly increase the number of dendritic spines and to restore aspects of functional connectivity. Additional neuroplasticity promoting compounds with therapeutic effects that were both rapid and enduring have been identified through classes of compounds including serotonergic psychedelics, cholinergic scopolamine, and other novel compounds. To differentiate between traditional antidepressants focused on monoamine modulation and this new category of fast acting antidepressants that achieve therapeutic effects through neuroplasticity, the term psychoplastogen was introduced. The development of non-hallucinogenic psychoplastogens such as zalsupindole, which are sometimes called neuroplastogens, has gained traction.

=== Nicotine ===
Nicotine affects the brain by binding to nicotinic acetylcholine receptors, the same receptors acetylcholine binds to, which has been linked with Neuroplasticity. Nicotine use may lower the rate of neuroplasticity in the brain by damaging the nicotinic-acetylcholine receptors needed to reuptake the acetylcholine necessary for neuroplasticity.

== Theoretical Implications ==
=== Psychology and cognitive science ===
Evidence of neural plasticity has significantly influenced debates in psychology and cognitive science, particularly the longstanding dispute between empiricists and nativists regarding the nature of the human mind. Empiricists argue that the brain's capacity for reorganization demonstrates that cognitive capacities are largely a reflection of a learner's experience, challenging nativist claims that the mind has considerable innate structure. However, other researchers point to constrained plasticity — the finding that certain brain regions consistently take on the same functional roles even under dramatically different developmental conditions, and that some cognitive abilities may never fully recover following brain injury or disease — as evidence in favour of nativist accounts of innate core cognitive capacities, such as face recognition and the ability to understand people's mental states. According to this view, constrained plasticity reveals the operation of innate specialized mechanisms that guide neural development toward certain functional outcomes regardless of variation in experience.

== See also ==
- Activity-dependent plasticity
- Brain training
- Environmental enrichment (neural)
- Neural adaptation
- Neural backpropagation
- Neuronal sprouting
- Neuroplastic effects of pollution
- Psychobabble
- Psychoplastogen
- Psychedelic drug
- Kinesiology
- Spike-timing-dependent plasticity
