= José Mira Mira =

Spanish scientist (1944–2008)

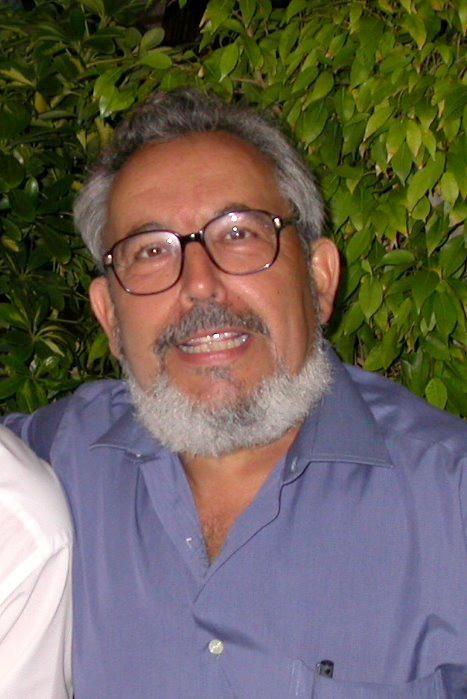
José Mira Mira, by June 2005.

José Mira Mira (December 31, 1944 – August 13, 2008) Spanish scientist, Professor of Computational Sciences and Artificial Intelligence and Director of the Artificial Intelligence Department of the Computational Science Engineering's ETS in the UNED, until his death.

His research interest was related to the methodological aspects of Knowledge Engineering and the relations between Neuroscience and Computation. From an applied perspective, his interest was focused on Knowledge Based Systems (KBS) development in Industry and Medicine domains, including DIAGEN project and no less than other 10 CICYT and ESPRIT projects. On such subjects he mentored about 30 Ph D Thesis and published more than 300 works in magazines of the field. For more than 10 years, Professor Mira was sponsor and chairman of the biennial conferences IWANN and then he worked to set up and consolidate a new interdisciplinary series of conferences on concepts, techniques, and tools between "Natural Computation" and artificial computation, the currently biennial conferences IWINAC.

== Early years ==
José Mira Mira was born in Pinoso, Alicante (Spain), on December 31, 1944. He obtained his high-school diploma at the Hermanos Maristas school in Murcia (Spain).

== Complutense University of Madrid ==
He obtained his bachelor's degree in Physics in the Complutense University of Madrid in October 1966 he joined the Laboratory of Biocybernetics and Bionics associated to the Instituto de Electricidad y Automática of the Spanish National Research Council and the Department of Electricity of the Faculty of Sciences of the Complutense University of Madrid. This Laboratory had been recently created by Professor José Garcia Santesmases, who mentored him in his Ph.D. thesis "Cybernetic Models of Learning", dissertation defended in 1971. In this epoch, he was strongly influenced by his collaboration with Professor Roberto Moreno-Díaz, who had rejoined the Laboratory of Biocybernetics and Bionics of the Complutense University of Madrid after he returned from the USA, where he had been working as a researcher since 1965, in the Laboratory of Electronics of the Massachusetts Institute of Technology (MIT) with Warren S. McCulloch.

== University of Granada ==
In 1975, he became a Professor of Electronics in the University of Granada. There he mentored the Ph.D. thesis of his wife, Ana Delgado, "Neurocybernetic Models of Brain Dynamics". It was precisely in the beginning of this process (as his wife tells in the preface of the book mentioned here in the footnotes), and because of Professor Mira wanted the thesis to be focused on certain properties of the brain functions, like cooperation and functional sharing, in order to study the correlation between local traumatic injury and the subsequent lack of functionalities, that Professor Mira got to know the eminent Spanish scientist Justo Gonzalo, beginning a close friendship that would last his whole life. Between 1976 and 1978 he is also Chief of Studies of the University College of Almeria, which was attached to the University of Granada; this college would become the University of Almeria.

== University of Santiago de Compostela ==
In 1981, he obtained the chairmanship of Electronics Department in the University of Santiago de Compostela. In a couple of years, almost the whole team of collaborators that Professor Mira had in the University of Granada had joined the University of Santiago de Compostela. In 1986 he participates as main researcher in Spain in an ESPRIT project of the (nowadays) European Union, the first ESPRIT project achieved by a Spanish group.

The mark left by Professor Mira led the university to take on the posthumous publication of the series "Profesor José Mira" in Neuroscience and Computation, beginning such series with a volume dedicated to Justo Gonzalo, in 2010.

== National University of Distance Education (UNED) ==
Professor Mira joined the UNED by 1989, where he became head of the Computational Science and Artificial Intelligence Department, firstly in the Faculty of Physics, then, from 2002, in the Computational Science Engineering's ETS faculty.

In October 2003, he gave the master lecture during the opening ceremony of the academic year 2003-2004.

In July 2006, he gave the master lecture of the Artificial Intelligence's 50th Anniversary Conference (Campus Multidisciplinar en Percepción e Inteligencia de Albacete 2006). In the same conference he gave another lecture titled "Science and Engineering of Intelligence". Professor Rodolfo Llinás attended from the New York University Medical Center

== Death ==
José Mira Mira died on August 13, 2008, in Madrid, Spain, after a short, sudden and fatal illness.

The National University of Distance Education (UNED) made a tribute to him, an event chaired by the UNED's president on November 5, 2008, which was broadcast live by the Spanish state-owned television channel "La 2" (in Spanish).
