= Point of subjective simultaneity =

In multisensory integration research, point of subjective simultaneity (PSS), typically measured in milliseconds, is defined as the stimulus onset asynchrony (SOA) at which a pair of signals from different sensory modalities is perceived as most simultaneous or synchronous. In other words, at PSS, an individual is most likely to integrate information from a pair of signals in the two given modalities.

== PSS computation ==
In behavioral experiments, test individuals are usually presented with pairs of signals from different sensory modalities (such as visual and audio) at different SOAs and asked to make either synchrony judgements (i.e. if the pair of signals appears to have come at the exact same time) or temporal order judgements (i.e. which signal appears to have come earlier than the other). Results from an individual's synchrony judgement tasks are typically fitted to a Gaussian curve with average perceived synchrony in percentage (between 0 and 1) on the y-axis and SOA (in milliseconds) on the x-axis, and the PSS of this individual is defined as the mean of the Gaussian distribution. Alternatively, results from an individual's temporal order judgement tasks are typically fitted to an S-shaped logistic psychometric curve, with percentage of trials where the subject responds that signals from one certain modality has come first on the y-axis and SOA (in ms) on the x-axis. In this setting, the PSS is defined as the SOA corresponding to the point at which the percentage on the y-axis is 50%, where this individual is the most unsure about which signal has come first.

== PSS in autism research ==
Studies have suggested that individuals with Autism Spectrum Disorder (ASD) process sensory information differently than their typically developing (TD) peers. Specifically, research has found that two groups exhibit different levels of multisensory temporal recalibration by comparing how much PSS changes in individuals with ASD and TD individuals after presenting them with biased audio-visual stimuli. Temporal recalibration is a phenomenon quantified by the shift in PSS after an individual is exposed to stimuli that are biased towards one particular sensory modality (e.g. only presenting them audio-visual pairs where audio comes before the video). Evidence suggests that after being exposed to bias stimuli, negative correlation can be found between level of temporal recalibration (change in PSS) and subjects’ level of autistic traits, specifically attention to detail. This finding supports the idea that differences in sensory perception in individuals with ASD may be a contributing factor of their autistic behavioral traits.
