= El Pinós / Pinoso =

Pinoso El Pinós
- Municipality
- Pinoso / El Pinós
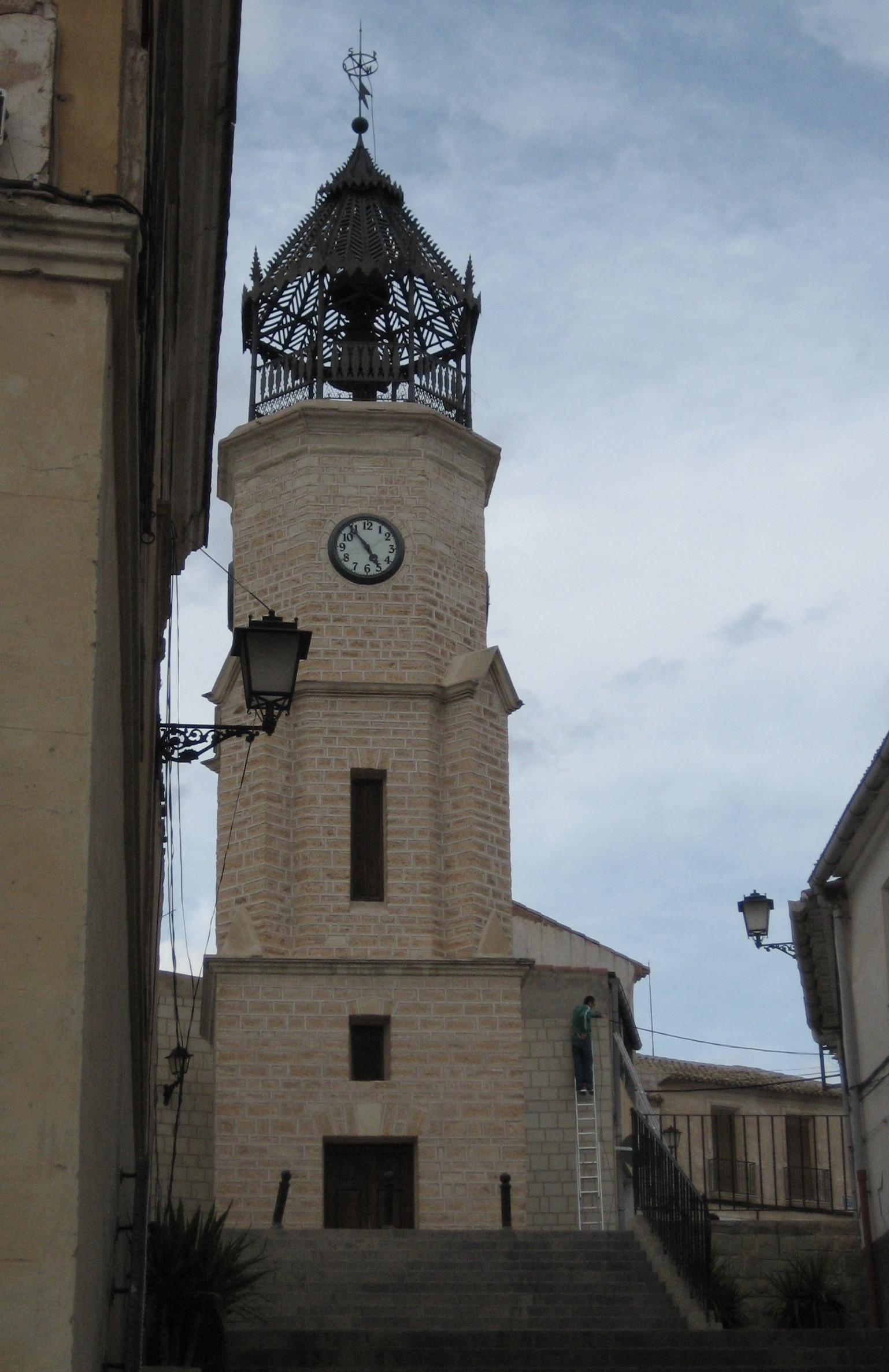
- Torre del Reloj.

- Flag Coat of arms

- Location in the Province of Alicante Location in the Valencian Community Location in Spain
- Coordinates: 38°24′12″N 1°2′32″W
- Country: Spain
- Autonomous community: Valencian Community
- Province: Alicante
- Comarca: Vinalopó Mitjà
- Judicial district: Novelda

Government
  - Mayor: José María Amorós Carbonell (2007) (PP)

Area
  - Total: 126.9 km^{2} (49.0 sq mi)
- Elevation: 450 m (1,480 ft)

Population (2025-01-01)
  - Total: 8,523
  - Density: 67.16/km^{2} (174.0/sq mi)
- Demonym: Pinoseros
- Time zone: UTC+1 (CET)
  - Summer (DST): UTC+2 (CEST)
- Postal code: 03650
- Official language(s): Valencian, Spanish
- Website: Official website

El Pinós / Pinoso (Valencian: [el pi'nos]) / Spanish: [piˈnoso]), officially in Valencian and Spanish) is a traditional town which sits located in the mountainous countryside of the Alicante/Murcia border (at some 56 km from Alacant). This traditional town is renowned for the production of fine wines, rock salt and marble. Pinoso has a population of 7,300 and a municipal area of 126 km^{2}. Recently it has experienced a growth in tourism.

There are 10 minor local entities within the municipality area: El Rodriguillo, Culebró, Les Enzebres, Ubeda, Cases d'Ibáñez or Les Casetes, Lel, Cases del Pi, El Paredó, La Cavallussa and Tresfonts.

== Notable people ==
- José Mira Mira (1944–2008), Spanish scientist.
- Pedro Solbes Mira (1942–2023), Spanish politician, former minister of economic affairs, of Spain, and also former European commissioner for economic and monetary affairs in the European Commission (European Union).
