= Neuronal sprouting =

Any process where neurite growth occurs

Neuronal sprouting is any process where neurite growth occurs, typically through modifications to synapses where a neuron outgrowths to establish connections to other neurons. It is both the growth of new branches or extensions from existing neurons in response to injury or disease. This process is a form of neuroplasticity, which allows the brain to rewire itself and adapt to changes in the environment. Neural sprouting is thought to play an important role in recovery from brain injury, where the brain compensates for lost function by forming new connections between neurons.

In neural sprouting, new branches are formed from existing neurons, which can extend towards areas of injury or disease. These new branches can form new connections with other neurons, allowing the brain to redirect inputs to undamaged areas and compensate for the loss of function in the damaged area. While neural sprouting can be a beneficial process for recovery from brain injury, it can also have negative effects in some cases. For example, in certain neurodegenerative conditions, such as Alzheimer's disease, abnormal sprouting of neurons may contribute to the spread of the disease and further neuronal death. Therefore, while neural sprouting is an important form of neuroplasticity, it is a complex process that can have both positive and negative effects, depending on the specific circumstances and the nature of the injury or disease.
