= Justo Gonzalo =

Spanish neuroscientist (1910–1986)

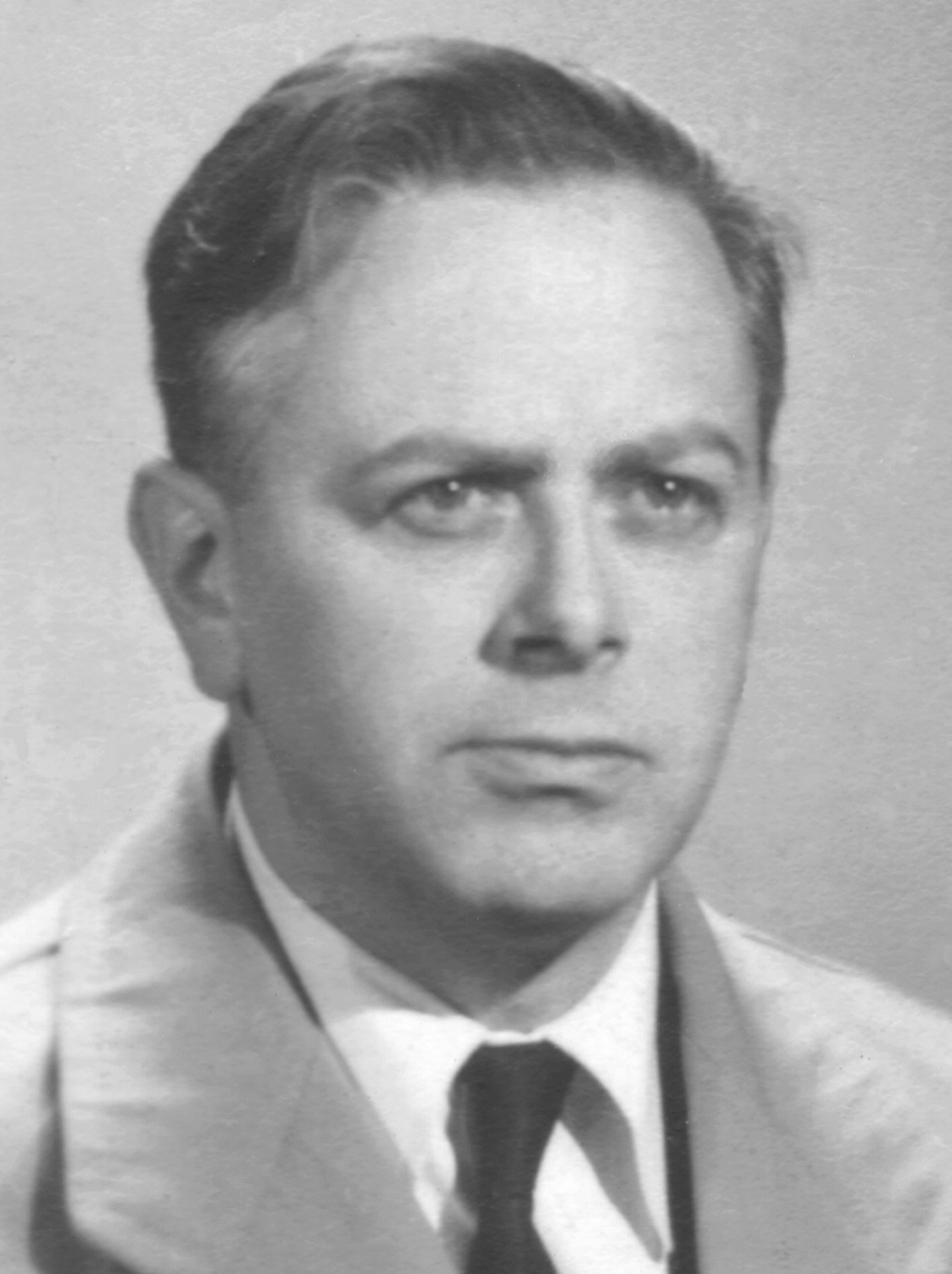
Justo Gonzalo Rodríguez-Leal (1910–1986)

Justo Gonzalo y Rodríguez-Leal (March 2, 1910 – September 28, 1986), was a Spanish neuroscientist who was born in Barcelona and died in Madrid. After obtaining his bachelor's degree in medicine he specialized in Austria and Germany (1933–1935) with a grant from the Junta para Ampliación de Estudios e Investigaciones Científicas [Committee for the Extension of Studies and Scientific Research], and subsequently carried out extensive research on human brain functions based largely on brain injuries from the Spanish Civil War (1936–1939). He characterized what he called the central syndrome of the cortex (multisensory and bilateral disorder caused by a unilateral lesion in a parieto-occipital association area), which he interpreted based on physiological laws of nervous excitability and a model of brain dynamics where the cortex is conceived as a dynamic functional unit with specificity in gradation, providing a solution to the question of brain localization. He described and interpreted phenomena such as inverted perception and multisensory and motor facilitation, among others. By applying concepts of dynamic similarity, he formulated and proved allometric power laws in the loss of functions and in the sensory organization. He belonged to the Spanish National Research Council (CSIC) from 1942 until his retirement, and he was lecturer of 21 PhD courses (1945–1966) on brain physiopathology at the Faculty of Medicine in the University of Madrid. He received awards from the CSIC (1941), the Royal Academy of Medicine (1950) and the Spanish Society of Psychology (1958).

== His scientific contribution ==
His book Investigaciones sobre la nueva Dinámica Cerebral. La actividad cerebral en función de las condiciones dinámicas de la excitabilidad nerviosa contains part of his fundamental contributions and is the first time that the term Brain Dynamics is used in the scientific literature to describe the organization of sensory functions. It consists of two volumes, the first one published in 1945 focused on visual functions and the second one published in 1950 dedicated to tactile functions and where concepts exposed in the first one are expanded. In this book the author exposes what he called central syndrome of the cortex, as a multisensory affection with bilateral symmetry, originated by a unilateral parieto-occipital cortical lesion in an associative area equidistant from the visual, tactile, and auditory projection areas.

The syndrome presents dynamic effects such as the multisensoriality and symmetrical bilaterality of the disorder, which also involves all functions from simple excitability to more complex functions. Another dynamic effect is the progressive loss of functions and a decomposition of some of them into partial reactions as the intensity of the stimulus decreases. This gives rise, for example, to tilted or even inverted vision, in which the image is perceived as increasingly tilted at the same time as it loses shape, color and size until it is almost inverted in the most acute case. This was the first exhaustive study of inverted or tilted vision (Gonzalo, 1945). The author also observed inverted perception in touch (1950) and hearing (1952), for none of which there were precedents, and generalized the inversion process in the central syndrome to sensory systems of a spatial nature. Gnosic or cognitive and complex functions are the first to be lost since they require greater brain excitation and, thus, greater brain integration. Thus, a continuity was established between elementary and higher sensory functions, based on the same physiological laws.

A dynamic phenomenon related to the previous one is the disappearance in part of some disorders by intensification of the stimulus or by temporal summation (iteration of the stimulus), or by the emerging capacity for facilitation, according to which the functions are recovered by the presence of another type of stimulus of the same or different modality (multisensory facilitation), or by motor activity such as muscular effort, of all of which there was no precedent of detailed studies. For example, tactile and auditory stimuli, and in particular muscular effort, improve perception, partly compensating for the deficit of nervous excitation due to the loss of nonspecific (or multispecific) neuronal mass caused by the lesion. For example, the visual field, which shows concentric reduction, increased up to 5 times in the most acute case, and the image recovered the correct orientation by means of a strong muscular contraction. This capacity is greater the larger the brain lesion and the lower the intensity of the original stimulus.

The author observed and studied other remarkable phenomena such as color delocalization, reversal in motion perception, the disorder by which the patient was able to read a text equally well upright or rotated 180 degrees without noticing any difference, and the disorder of allocentric orientation, among others.

His research filled the gap then existing between brain pathology and the physiology of the nervous system, since the phenomena observed were governed by the laws of nervous excitability, which was a radical change with respect to the concepts in use at that time.

Gonzalo found not only the cases described in his book but about 35 cases of central syndrome of varying intensity (Gonzalo, 1952). The author also analyzes in depth the famous Schneider case of Goldstein and Gelb (1918), which he interprets according to the aforementioned syndrome.

He proposed a spiral development of the sensory field in the integrative brain process (Gonzalo, 1951, 1952) and introduced the idea of functional brain gradients across the cortex (Gonzalo, 1952). These gradients are functions in gradation that represent the density of specific sensory function at each point in the cortex, related to the density of specific neurons and their connections, taking a maximum value in the corresponding projection area and gradually decreasing throughout the cortex, with the end of the decline reaching other projection areas. The multiple types of cortical syndromes from first hand and other authors was interpreted according to the model of gradients, depending on the position and magnitude of the lesion, finding a continuous transition between the syndromes of the projection area and the central one.

Gonzalo later developed the concepts of dynamic similarity and allometry applied to the central syndrome, this being understood as the result of a change of scale in the nervous excitability of the cerebral system with respect to the normal case. According to the principle of dynamic similarity, the change of scale in a system results in its different parts changing differently (allometrically). He then found allometric relationships, scaling power laws, between the different sensory functions. The gradual loss of these functions in the central syndrome was thus interpreted and formalized. These concepts, including that of gradients, were also applied to the language system. All this last research remained unpublished and is partially collected in Supplement II in the reprint of Gonzalo's work (Gonzalo, 2010) and in later works, (see below the works of Gonzalo-Fonrodona and Porras in the section 'Works on Justo Gonzalo's research work').

== Early years ==
Justo Gonzalo was born and lived in Barcelona, Spain; then spent several years in Valencia, Spain; returned to Barcelona, and finally moved to Madrid, Spain, to study medicine, obtaining his bachelor's degree there in 1933. During 1933–34, he carried out studies at the Nervenklinik (mental hospital) of the University of Vienna, on clinical neurology and animal testing with Hans Hoff, and also on brain cytoarchitecture with Otto Pötzl, at Constantin von Economo's laboratory. During 1934–35 he carried out research on brain pathology with Karl Kleist at the mental hospital of the Goethe University Frankfurt, granted a scholarship by the Junta para Ampliación de Estudios e Investigaciones Científicas [Committee for the Extension of Studies and Scientific Research]. After returning to Madrid, he combined clinical neurology at the then called Hospital General de Madrid with brain anatomoclinical research at the Cajal Institute.

It was during this time that he wrote his first works (see section: Justo Gonzalo's published works).

== Spanish Civil War and post-war period ==
After the outbreak of the Spanish Civil War (1936–1939), he resumed the neurological activities at the Hospital General de Madrid and the brain anatomoclinical studies at the Cajal Institute until he practiced war medicine in the Republican front (1937). He was called in 1938 by Gonzalo Rodríguez Lafora, head of the Center for Brain Injuries at Neurological Military Hospital of Godella (Hospital Militar Neurológico de Godella) in Valencia, to work there as a neurologist, where he stayed until the end of the war. During this period, he conducted detailed observations on numerous brain-injured subjects and performed, despite the extreme conditions, a fundamental part of his research. Some selected cases were carefully study in the course of several years.

In the summer of 1938, he discovered, among other singular disorders, near-inverted vision in the war wounded man he termed case M, and in 1939 characterized what he called central syndrome of the cortex, which exhibited peculiar dynamic phenomena. The observations could not be understood until he uncovered the permeability developed by this type of patient to temporal summation and multisensory and motor facilitation.

The first results were presented in 1941 to the Spanish National Research Council in a 94-page report in Spanish entitled Investigaciones sobre Dinámica Cerebral. La dinámica en el sistema nervioso. Estructuras sensoriales por sincronización cerebral (Research on Brain Dynamics. Dynamics in the nervous system. Sensory structures by brain synchronization), which was awarded by this organism that same year. During the years 1942–1944, established in Madrid and sponsored by the Cajal Institute, he obtained a more precise quantitative evaluation of the phenomena, in spite of the difficulties in obtaining the most indispensable experimental instruments.

In 1945, the Cajal Institute, now part of the Spanish National Research Council, published the first volume of his book on Brain Dynamics, mainly devoted to visual functions. Apart from local references to the aforementioned volume at the time of its publication, other references stand out, some of them international despite the fact that the book was written in Spanish, being notorious, for example, the comment by Viembi in 1946 in the prestigious magazine edited by Buscaino:

"...a very accurate study carried out for years ... The book is very rich in objective observations, most of them original and of great interest. It is also rich in theoretical deductions ... A series of very interesting and important facts which agree with the known facts of the biology of the nervous system.... The author has made a truly meticulous analysis of the visual sensory functions..... Particularly noteworthy is the phenomenon of tilted or inverted vision, this being the first case in the international literature of almost chronic duration and which was studied for months and months ... The longest known observation of duration was limited to a few hours. In the patient now under examination the phenomenon was provoked at will by progressive moving away a test object, or by decreasing the intensity of illumination, or by eccentric position in the visual field ... the book is an inexhaustible mine of singularities..." (translated from Italian),

or the commentary by Bender and Teuber (1948):

"Thus far, the American and English literature has failed to produce a monograph similar in scope to Gonzalo's Dinámica Cerebral which was based on experiments with brain injured casualties of the Spanish Civil War".

Also De Ajuriaguerra and Hecaen refer in several pages to this research and emphasize (p. 279): "...let us also cite in Spanish the very important volume by J. Gonzalo" (translated from French). He also received in 1945–46 letters of praises from authors such as H. Piéron, Robert Bing, D. Katz, W. Köhler (the last two in connection with Gestalt theory), G. Rodríguez Lafora, C. Jiménez Díaz, J. Germain, etc.

From 1942 until his retirement, Justo Gonzalo was a full-time member of the Spanish National Research Council. From 1945 he taught PhD-level courses in brain pathophysiology at the University of Madrid, where he had a laboratory of brain physiopathology. In his PhD courses, he presented the results of his research in detail. It can be said that he worked alone in the scientific aspect, occasionally helped in other aspects by some former students, administrative personnel and always supported by his family, and since 1945 by his wife Ana María Fonrodona Masuet.

== Subsequent years ==
In 1950, the second volume of the aforementioned book on Brain Dynamics was published, it was focused on tactile functions and to generalization of concepts introduced in the first volume. Justo Gonzalo describes in it his observation in 1946 of tactile inversion (of which there were no precedents) and its interpretation. Thus, the author generalized the inversion process in the aforementioned central syndrome to all sensory systems of spatial nature, corroborating it in the auditory system in 1946, as he refers to in his subsequent publication in 1952 (Gonzalo 1952). In 1950 he was awarded by the Spanish Royal Academy of Medicine.

In the works published in 1951 and 1952 (see section 'Justo Gonzalo's published works'), Gonzalo set forth the idea of spiral development of the sensory field, as well as the so-called functional cerebral gradients through the cortex (Gonzalo 1952), concepts that he had already described in detail in the PhD courses. In the publication of 1952 he includes about 20 cases of central syndromes of varying intensity.

In 1952 he carried out a search in all the Spanish territory of subjects with brain lesions. He selected about 200 out of near 3000. Most of them are Civil War wounded and he explores them in Madrid. He finds a total of 35 cases with the same type of central syndrome of varying intensity, as shown for example on p. 78 of Supplement II of the reprint Dinámica Cerebral of 2010.

In the PhD courses, which he taught with great vehemence and dedication, he also exposed the concepts of dynamic similarity and allometry applied to the aforementioned syndrome, this latter being understood as the result of a change of scale in the nervous excitability of the system with respect to that of the normal case. He did not get to publish these concepts, which are partially collected in subsequent works. Among the many private comments he received from students about the Ph.D. courses, the one with a reference is indicated, as well as the comment that appears, in 1967, in a commemorative publication of the "Neurology Service of Nicolás Achúcarro":

"M. Peraita prematurely dead, the only one dealing with neurological matters in Madrid is Justo Gonzalo, a clinician and researcher out of the common ... giving an original solution – the concept of gradients – to the problem of localization of the different functions in the cerebral cortex ... (his) presence in the University as professor of a PhD course, is -with his original, updated, sharp course- the only encouragement to neurological vocations that has been present for years and years in the Faculty of Medicine of Madrid." (Translated from Spanish).

In 1958 he was awarded by the Spanish Society of Psychology, and in this period there were many references to the book

The book went out of print and was never reprinted.

Reorganizations in the Faculty of Medicine in 1966 prevented him from continuing to teach the aforementioned PhD courses despite the great interest they aroused among students and the request by letter to the Dean of the Faculty of Medicine signed by several Professors such as Vice-Dean Botella Llusiá, Jiménez Díaz, Gilsanz, Orts Llorca and Vara López. With this, the associated brain pathophysiology laboratory disappeared.

During these years he had already made large and numerous graphs drawn by draughtsmen, for didactic purposes, and especially for the following publication announced as an extensive work. But this publication never came into being. The cause of this was the author's own way of being, extremely self-demanding and who could not conceive of partial communications except for PhD courses, also great administrative difficulties, and with the passage of time, health problems.

== Last years ==
He further developed the concepts of similarity and allometry on the basis of the biological principles of development and growth, applying them to brain dynamics and extending this formalization to the auditory system and language, leading to what the author called a "neurophysics" of the cerebral cortex. Part of such research is collected in Supplement II of the 2010 reprint of his book and in works by Gonzalo-Fonrodona and Porras (2007, 2009, 2011, 2013, 2014) (see section: `Works on Justo Gonzalo's research'). He also approached multiple and varied subjects of Biology, Philosophy, Physics and Cybernetics, establishing connections with his research of brain dynamics.

At this time, reference is also made to J. Gonzalo's brain dynamics. even from a philosophical point of view, awakening a special interest in the field of Cybernetics and Artificial Intelligence.

In 1976 he came into contact with physicists and engineers interested in cybernetic models of brain dynamics. In this context, in the doctoral thesis of the engineer A. Delgado directed by the physicist J. Mira, several of Gonzalo's ideas and data are considered to be basic, together with those of Lashley and Luria, in the functional organization of nervous tissue in relation to behavior.

His research was interrupted only because of his death in 1986.

== Additional information ==
After the death of J. Gonzalo, work was carried out in the field of Artificial Intelligence in relation to the research of this author. His works are also referenced in an historical and neurological sense (see also the section `Works on Justo Gonzalo's research work´`).

For example, worth mentioning is the comment: "Besides Santiago Ramon y Cajal, several authors can be considered founders of the Spanish Neuroscience and Neuropsychology such as Cubí, Simarro, Lafora, Gonzalo, Lorente de Nó". (Translated from Spanish).

Studies carried out in the 2000s have reported phenomena on tilted or inverted perception and multisensory integration that are similar to those described by Justo Gonzalo. Also, cortical modellings proposed are closely related to the model developed by Justo Gonzalo. Presentation and formalization of the work of J. Gonzalo in the current context is exposed in the works of Gonzalo-Fonrodona and Porras listed below in the section `Works on Justo Gonzalo's research work´.

In 2010, coinciding with the centennial of his birth, the Red Temática en Tecnologías de Computación Artificial/Natural (thematic network on artificial/natural computation technologies), together with the University of Santiago de Compostela, published a facsimile edition of the two volumes published in 1945 and 1950 respectively, plus several annexes; the contents of Annex II (Suplemento II) had never been published before. The whole, of about 1000 pages, is entitled Dinámica Cerebral (Open Access).

J. Gonzalo's library was donated to the Spanish National Research Council (CSIC), the neurobiology part going to the Cajal Institute where 442 histological preparations made by Gonzalo, mainly between 1927 and 1933 while he was a medical student, were also deposited.

== Justo Gonzalo's published works ==
- Gonzalo, J. (1933). «Los factores endógenos en la corea de Sydenham». Archivos de Neurobiología XIII(4,5,6): pp. 1–15. ISSN 0212-9329.
- Gonzalo, J. (1934). «Contribución al estudio del esquizoide». Archivos de Neurobiología XIV(6): pp. 1–17. ISSN 0212-9329.
- Gonzalo, J. (1934). «Los tipos de motilidad. Contribución a la sistemática del movimiento.» Archivos de Neurobiología XIV(1): pp: 1-23. ISSN 0212-9329.
- Gonzalo, J. (1935). «Contestación al Dr. Nieto». Archivos de Neurobiología XV(3): pp. 417–421. ISSN 0212-9329.
- Gonzalo, J. (1935). «Sobre la localización y fisiopatología del tálamo y del subtálamo». Archivos de Neurobiología XV(4): pp. 625–668. ISSN 0212-9329
- Gonzalo, J. (1936). «Nuevos estudios talámicos. Síndrome talámico puro por degeneración secundaria». Archivos de Neurobiología. Marzo. pp. 111–129. ISSN 0212-9329
- Kleist, V.K.; Gonzalo, J. (1938). «Über Thalamus und Subthalamussyndrome und die Störungen einzelner Thalamuskerne». Monastsschrift für Psychiatrie und Neurologie 99: pp. 87–130.
- Gonzalo, J. (1945). Investigaciones sobre la nueva Dinámica Cerebral. La actividad cerebral en función de las condiciones dinámicas de la excitabilidad nerviosa. Volumen Primero: pp. 1–392. Madrid: Consejo Superior de Investigaciones Científicas, Inst. S. Ramón y Cajal. Included as Vol. 1 in the facsimile edition of 2010,Dinámica Cerebral, Open Access, and in the English edition of 2023 Brain Dynamics, Open Access.
- Gonzalo, J. (1950). Investigaciones sobre la nueva Dinámica Cerebral. La actividad cerebral en función de las condiciones dinámicas de la excitabilidad nerviosa. Volumen Segundo: pp. 393–827. Madrid: Consejo Superior de Investigaciones Científicas, Inst. S. Ramón y Cajal. Included as Vol. 2 in the facsimile edition of 2010 Dinámica Cerebral, Open Access, and in the English edition of 2023 Brain Dynamics, Open Access.
- Gonzalo, J. (1951). «La cerebración sensorial y el desarrollo espiral». Trabajos del Inst. Cajal de Investigaciones Biológicas XLIII: pp. 209–260.
- Gonzalo, J. (1952) «Las funciones cerebrales humanas según nuevos datos y bases fisiológicas. Una introducción a los estudios de Dinámica Cerebral». Trabajos del Inst. Cajal de Investigaciones Biológicas XLIV: pp. 95–157. Included as 'Suplemento I' in the facsimile edition of 2010 Dinámica Cerebral, Open Access, and in the English edition of 2023 Brain Dynamics, Open Access.
- Gonzalo, J. (1994). Brain Dynamics According to Human Data and Physiological Bases. (Traducción resumida de la publicación de 1952). Edited by I. Gonzalo and A. Gonzalo, Madrid. ISBN 84-604-9611-2
- Gonzalo, J. (2010). Dinámica Cerebral. Facsimile edition of Vol.1 (1945), Vol.2 (1950), Suplemento I (article of 1952) and first edition of Suplemento II. RTNAC and USC, Open Access.
- Gonzalo, J. (2023). Brain Dynamics. English edition (Vols.1 and 2, Supplements I and II) I. Gonzalo Fonrodona (ed.) Editorial CSIC. Open Access.

== Works on Justo Gonzalo's research work ==
- Ballus, C. (1970). «La maniobra de refuerzo de J. Gonzalo y su objetivización por el test oscilométrico». Anuario de Psicología. Dep. Psicología, Univ. de Barcelona 2: pp. 19–28.
- Gonzalo, I.; Gonzalo, A. (1996). «Functional gradients in cerebral dynamics: The J. Gonzalo theories of the sensorial cortex». In Moreno-Díaz, R.; Mira, J. (Eds.) Brain Processes, Theories and Models. An international conference in honor of W.S. McCulloch 25 years after his death. Cambridge, Massachusetts: The MIT Press. pp. 78–87.
- Gonzalo, I. (1997). «Allometry in the J. Gonzalo's model of the sensorial cortex» . Lecture Notes in Computer Science (LNCS) 1240: pp. 169–177. https://doi.org/10.1007/BFb0032475
- Gonzalo, I. (1999). «Spatial Inversion and Facilitation in the J. Gonzalo's Research of the Sensorial Cortex. Integrative Aspects». Lect. Not. Comp. Sci. (LNCS) 1606: pp. 94–103. https://doi.org/10.1007/BFb0098164
- Gonzalo, I.; Porras, M.A. (2001). «Time-dispersive effects in the J. Gonzalo's research on cerebral dynamics». Lect. Not. Comp. Sci. (LNCS) 2084: pp. 150–157. https://doi:10.1007/3-540-45720-8_18
- Gonzalo, I.; Porras, M.A. (2003). «Intersensorial summation as a nonlinear contribution to cerebral excitation». Lect. Not. Comp. Sci. (LNCS) 2686: pp. 94–101. https://doi:10.1007/3-540-44868-3_13
- Arias, M.; Gonzalo, I. (2004). «La obra neurocientífica de Justo Gonzalo (1910–1986): el síndrome central y la metamorfopsia invertida». Neurología 19: pp. 429–433.
- Barraquer Bordas, L. (2005). «La dinámica cerebral de Justo Gonzalo en la historia [`Brain dynamics' of Justo Gonzalo in history]». Neurología 20: pp. 169–173.
- Gonzalo-Fonrodona, I. (2007). «Inverted or tilted perception disorder». Revista de Neurología 44(3): pp. 157–165.
- Gonzalo-Fonrodona, I.; Porras, M.A. (2007). «Physiological Laws of Sensory Visual System in Relation to Scaling Power Laws in Biological Neural Networks». Lecture Notes in Computer Science (LNCS) 4527: pp. 96–102. https://doi.org/10.1007/978-3-540-73053-8_10
- Gonzalo-Fonrodona, I. (2009). «Functional gradients through the cortex, multisensory integration and scaling laws in brain dynamics». Neurocomputing 72: pp. 831–838. https://doi.org/10.1016/j.neucom.2008.04.055
- Gonzalo-Fonrodona, I.; Porras, M.A. (2009). «Scaling Power Laws in the Restoration of Perception with Increasing Stimulus in Deficitary Natural Neural Network» . Lecture Notes in Computer Science (LNCS) 5601: pp. 174–183. https://doi.org/10.1007/978-3-642-02264-7_19
- Gonzalo-Fonrodona, I.; Porras, M.A. (2011). «Scaling Effects in Crossmodal Improvement of Visual Perception» . Lecture Notes in Computer Science (LNCS) 6687: pp. 267–274. https://doi.org/10.1007/978-3-642-21326-7_29
- Gonzalo Fonrodona, I. (2011). «Justo Gonzalo (1919–1986) y su investigación sobre dinámica cerebral». Rev. Historia de la Psicología 32: pp. 65–78. ISSN 0211-0040.
- Gonzalo-Fonrodona, I.; Porras, M.A. (2013). «Scaling effects in crossmodal improvement of visual perception by motor system stimulus». Neurocomputing 114: pp. 76–79. https://doi.org/10.1016/j.neucom.2012.06.047
- Gonzalo-Fonrodona, I.; Porras, M.A. (2013). «Deficitary nervous excitability and subjective contraction of time: Time-dispersive model». Lecture Notes in Computer Science (LNCS) 7930: pp. 368–375. https://doi.org/10.1007/978-3-642-38637-4_38
- Gonzalo-Fonrodona, I.; Porras, M.A. (2014). «Nervous excitability dynamics in a multisensory síndrome and its similitude with normals. Scaling Laws», Open Access. In: Costa, A.; Villalba, E. (Eds.) Horizons in Neuroscience Vol. 13: Chap.10, pp. 161–189. ISBN 978-1-62948-426-6
- Gonzalo Fonrodona, I. (2015). «The pioneering research of justo Gonzalo (1910–1986) on brain dynamics». Open Access. (Includes English translation of the article Gonzalo, J. (1952) «Las funciones cerebrales humanas según nuevos datos y bases fisiológicas. Una introducción a los estudios de Dinámica Cerebral» Traba. Inst. Cajal Investig. Biológ. XLIII: pp. 209–260). E-prints Complutense, Universidad Complutense de Madrid (UCM).
- Gonzalo-Fonrodona, I.; Porras, M.A. (2015). «Modelling the compression of perceived time by a cerebral system with nervous excitability and near perception threshold». Neurocomputing 151: pp. 85–90.
- Gonzalo Fonrodona, I.; Porras, M.A. (2015). «El neurocientífico Justo Gonzalo (1910-1986) antes, durante y después de la Guerra Civil Española». En Ciencia y Técnica entre la paz y la guerra, F. González Redondo (coord.), Vol.1: pp. 431–438. XII congreso de la Sociedad Española de las Ciencias y de las Técnicas (SEHCYT).
- García-Molina, A. (2015). «Justo Gonzalo’s groundbreaking contributions to the study of cerebral functional organisation». Neurosciences and History 3(2): pp. 61–67.
- García-Molina, A.; Gonzalo-Fonrodona, I. (2023). «Redescubriendo al paciente M: Justo Gonzalo Rodríguez-Leal y su teoría de la dinámica cerebral». Rev. Neurol. 76 (7): pp. 231–241.
- García-Molina, A.; Gonzalo-Fonrodona, I. (2024). «Chronology of Justo Gonzalo's research on brain dynamics». Rev. Neurol. 78(7): 199–207.
- Gonzalo Fonrodona, I. (2024). «La extensa recopilación de heridos cerebrales por Justo Gonzalo (1910-1986) y los gradientes cerebrales». En: Ciencia, técnica y libertad en España Puig-Samper, López Sánchez, Prados Martín Lérida Jiménez (eds.). Cap. VIII pp:447-452. SEHCYT y Fundación Ignacio Larramendi. ISBN 978-84-9744-456-9
- García-Molina, A. (2024). «Book review: Brain Dynamics». Neurosciences and History 12(2): 117–122.
- Gonzalo-Fonrodona, I. (2025). «Historical Note on Multisensory and Motor Facilitation and its Dependence on Brain Excitability Deficit». Multisensory Research. Open Access.
- Gonzalo-Fonrodona, I. (2026). «Justo Gonzalo (1910-1986): a pioneer of brain dynamics». Frontiers in Neuroanatomy. Open Access.
