= Projection areas =

Regions of the brain's lobes where sensory processing occurs

Projection areas are areas in the four lobes (frontal, parietal, temporal, occipital) of the brain where sensory processing occurs.
