= Phaeodactylibacter luteus =

Scientific classification
- Domain: Bacteria
- Kingdom: Pseudomonadati
- Phylum: Bacteroidota
- Class: Saprospiria
- Order: Saprospirales
- Family: Lewinellaceae
- Genus: Phaeodactylibacter
- Species: P. luteus

Binomial name
- Phaeodactylibacter luteus Lei et al. 2015

Type strain
- KCTC 42180, MCCC 1F01222, GYP20

Species of bacterium

Phaeodactylibacter luteus is a Gram-negative, aerobic and non-motile bacterium from the genus of Rubidimonas which has been isolated from the alga Picochlorum from the Indian Ocean.
