= Phaeodactylibacter xiamenensis =

Scientific classification
- Domain: Bacteria
- Kingdom: Pseudomonadati
- Phylum: Bacteroidota
- Class: Saprospiria
- Order: Saprospirales
- Family: Lewinellaceae
- Genus: Phaeodactylibacter
- Species: P. xiamenensis

Binomial name
- Phaeodactylibacter xiamenensis Chen et al. 2014

Type strain
- KCTC 32575, MCCC 1F01213, KD52

Synonyms
- Phaeodactylumidibacter xiamenense

Species of bacterium

Phaeodactylibacter xiamenensis is a Gram-negative, aerobic, rod-shaped, chemoheterotrophic and non-motile bacterium from the genus of Rubidimonas which has been isolated from the alga Phaeodactylum tricornutum from Xiamen in China.
