= Lewinella antarctica =

Scientific classification
- Domain: Bacteria
- Kingdom: Pseudomonadati
- Phylum: Bacteroidota
- Class: Saprospiria
- Order: Saprospirales
- Family: Lewinellaceae
- Genus: Lewinella
- Species: L. antarctica

Binomial name
- Lewinella antarctica Oh et al. 2009

Type strain
- KCCM 42688, NBRC 103142, IMCC3223

Species of bacterium

Lewinella antarctica is a Gram-negative, obligately aerobic and chemoheterotrophic bacterium from the genus Lewinella which has been isolated from coastal seawater from the Antarctic.
