= Aureispira marina =

Scientific classification
- Domain: Bacteria
- Kingdom: Pseudomonadati
- Phylum: Bacteroidota
- Class: Saprospiria
- Order: Saprospirales
- Family: Saprospiraceae
- Genus: Aureispira
- Species: A. marina

Binomial name
- Aureispira marina Hosoya et al. 2006

Type strain
- IAM 15389, JCM 23197, TISTR 1719

Synonyms
- Aureospira marina

Species of bacterium

Aureispira marina is a bacterium from the genus Aureispira which has been isolated from a marine sponge and an algae from the coastline of Thailand.
