= Lewinella aquimaris =

Scientific classification
- Domain: Bacteria
- Kingdom: Pseudomonadati
- Phylum: Bacteroidota
- Class: Saprospiria
- Order: Saprospirales
- Family: Lewinellaceae
- Genus: Lewinella
- Species: L. aquimaris

Binomial name
- Lewinella aquimaris Jung et al. 2016

Type strain
- CECT 8901, KCTC 42719, strain HDW-36

Species of bacterium

Lewinella aquimaris is a Gram-negative and non-motile bacterium from the genus Lewinella which has been isolated from seawater from the Yellow Sea in Korea.
