= Lewinella cohaerens =

Scientific classification
- Domain: Bacteria
- Kingdom: Pseudomonadati
- Phylum: Bacteroidota
- Class: Saprospiria
- Order: Saprospirales
- Family: Lewinellaceae
- Genus: Lewinella
- Species: L. cohaerens

Binomial name
- Lewinella cohaerens (Lewin 1970) Sly et al. 1998

Type strain
- ATCC 19593, ATCC 23123, II-2, NBRC 102661, NCIMB 12855, NCMB 1407

Synonyms
- Herpetosiphon cohaerens

Species of bacterium

Lewinella cohaerens is a bacterium from the genus Lewinella which has been isolated from mid-littoral mud in Biarritz in France.
