= Lewinella persica =

Scientific classification
- Domain: Bacteria
- Kingdom: Pseudomonadati
- Phylum: Bacteroidota
- Class: Saprospiria
- Order: Saprospirales
- Family: Lewinellaceae
- Genus: Lewinella
- Species: L. persica

Binomial name
- Lewinella persica (Lewin 1970) Sly et al. 1998

Type strain
- ATCC 23167, NBRC 102663, NCIMB 1396, T-3

Synonyms
- Herpetosiphon persicus Lewinella persicus

Species of bacterium

Lewinella persica is a bacterium from the genus Lewinella which has been isolated from mud from Galway in Ireland. 0
