= Aureispira =

Scientific classification
- Domain: Bacteria
- Kingdom: Pseudomonadati
- Phylum: Bacteroidota
- Class: Saprospiria
- Order: Saprospirales
- Family: Saprospiraceae
- Genus: Aureispira; Hosoya et al. 2006

Type species
- Aureispira marina Hosoya et al. 2006

Species
- Aureispira marina Aureispira maritima

Genus of bacteria

Aureispira is a Gram-negative and aerobic genus from the family Saprospiraceae.

== Ixotrophy ==
Aureispira gets its energy from a process called ixotrophy. Using this process, Aureispira can acquire energy from other micro-organisms by attaching grappling hooks to the flagella of bacteria and reeling them in to puncture the bacteria's plasma membranes.

A research team from the Federal Institute of Technology Zurich led by Yun-Wei Lien characterized this phenomenon through multiple experiments. It has been found that the grappling hook is a protein attached to the cellular membrane, composed of 5898 amino acids and organized in 7 stems, forming a tube with hollow lumen and hooks on top. Furthermore, this grappling hook bears key characteristics of type 9 secretion systems (often referred to as T9SS), a secretory system found in many bacteria.

To kill their prey, Aureispira bacteria use a type 6 secretion system (T6SS), another type of bacterial secretion system. In Aureispira, this T6SS is most notably accompanied by extracellular structures called antennae. The antennae have been molecularly characterized but their role remains elusive, although it could play a sensory role like animal whiskers. When triggered, the T6SS projects a spear-like structure into its prey's membrane, puncturing it.

This allows it to collect food for itself when there is not sufficient food sources available in the environment. In fact, nutrient availability can activate or deactivate the functioning of the T6SS, thus mediating the use of ixotrophy as a predatory method. When nutrients are abundant in the environment, the genes in the Aureispira genome change through the addition of insertion sequences, rendering it useless and deactivating predation by ixotrophy. When the nutrients in the environment go down again, these insertion sequences are removed, and the genes work again.

Yun-Wei Lien and colleagues proposed that through the process of ixotrophy, Aureispira (and other bacteria from the Saprospiraceae family) could play a role in shaping the marine microbiome. The abundance of genetic sequences from saprospiracea and vibrionaceae (typical prey for Ixotrophic bacteria) in oceanic environmental sample showed patterns similar to that of prey and predators.
