= Lewinella agarilytica =

Scientific classification
- Domain: Bacteria
- Kingdom: Pseudomonadati
- Phylum: Bacteroidota
- Class: Saprospiria
- Order: Saprospirales
- Family: Lewinellaceae
- Genus: Lewinella
- Species: L. agarilytica

Binomial name
- Lewinella agarilytica Lee 2007

Type strain
- JBRI 2009, JCM 14216, KCTC 12774, SST-19

Synonyms
- Lewinella agarolytica

Species of bacterium

Lewinella agarilytica is a Gram-negative and aerobic bacterium from the genus Lewinella which has been isolated from beach sediments on Jeju Island in Korea.
