= Lewinella marina =

Scientific classification
- Domain: Bacteria
- Kingdom: Pseudomonadati
- Phylum: Bacteroidota
- Class: Saprospiria
- Order: Saprospirales
- Family: Lewinellaceae
- Genus: Lewinella
- Species: L. marina

Binomial name
- Lewinella marina Khan et al. 2007

Type strain
- NBRC 102633, NCIMB 14312, MKG-38

Species of bacterium

Lewinella marina is a species of gram-negative bacterium from the genus Lewinella.
