= Lewinella xylanilytica =

Scientific classification
- Domain: Bacteria
- Kingdom: Pseudomonadati
- Phylum: Bacteroidota
- Class: Saprospiria
- Order: Saprospirales
- Family: Lewinellaceae
- Genus: Lewinella
- Species: L. xylanilytica

Binomial name
- Lewinella xylanilytica Sung et al. 2015

Type strain
- DSM 29526, KCTC 32663, 13-9-B8

Species of bacterium

Lewinella xylanilytica is a Gram-negative, rod-shaped, aerobic and non-motile bacterium from the genus Lewinella which has been isolated from coastal seawater from Marado on the Jeju Island on Korea.
