= Rubidimonas crustatorum =

Scientific classification
- Domain: Bacteria
- Kingdom: Pseudomonadati
- Phylum: Bacteroidota
- Class: Saprospiria
- Order: Saprospirales
- Family: Saprospiraceae
- Genus: Rubidimonas
- Species: R. crustatorum

Binomial name
- Rubidimonas crustatorum Yoon et al. 2012

Species of bacterium

Rubidimonas crustatorum is a Gram-negative, aerobic, rod-shaped and non-motile bacterium from the genus of Rubidimonas which has been isolated from Squillidae from the Ariake Sea near Nagasaki on Japan.
