= Lewinella lacunae =

Scientific classification
- Domain: Bacteria
- Kingdom: Pseudomonadati
- Phylum: Bacteroidota
- Class: Saprospiria
- Order: Saprospirales
- Family: Lewinellaceae
- Genus: Lewinella
- Species: L. lacunae

Binomial name
- Lewinella lacunae Kang et al. 2017

Type strain
- CECT 8679, KCTC 42187, strain HME9359

Species of bacterium

Lewinella lacunae is a Gram-negative, aerobic, rod-shaped bacterium from the genus Lewinella.
