= Aureispira maritima =

Scientific classification
- Domain: Bacteria
- Kingdom: Pseudomonadati
- Phylum: Bacteroidota
- Class: Saprospiria
- Order: Saprospirales
- Family: Saprospiraceae
- Genus: Aureispira
- Species: A. maritima

Binomial name
- Aureispira maritima Hosoya et al. 2007

Type strain
- IAM 15439, JCM 23207, TISTR 1726, 59SA

Species of bacterium

Aureispira maritima is a bacterium from the genus Aureispira which has been isolated from barnacle debris.
