= Lewinella lutea =

Scientific classification
- Domain: Bacteria
- Kingdom: Pseudomonadati
- Phylum: Bacteroidota
- Class: Saprospiria
- Order: Saprospirales
- Family: Lewinellaceae
- Genus: Lewinella
- Species: L. lutea

Binomial name
- Lewinella lutea Khan et al. 2007

Type strain
- NBRC 102634, NCIMB 14313, FYK2402M69

Synonyms
- Lewinella sediminis

Species of bacterium

Lewinella lutea is a bacterium from the genus Lewinella.
