= Flavilitoribacter =

Scientific classification
- Domain: Bacteria
- Kingdom: Pseudomonadati
- Phylum: Bacteroidota
- Class: Saprospiria
- Order: Saprospirales
- Family: Lewinellaceae
- Genus: Flavilitoribacter; García-López et al. 2020
- Species: F. nigricans

Binomial name
- Flavilitoribacter nigricans (Lewin 1970) García-López et al. 2020

Type strain
- ATCC 19592; ATCC 23147; NBRC 102662; NCIMB 1420; SS2

Synonyms
- Herpetosiphon nigricans Lewin 1970 (Approved Lists 1980); Lewinella nigricans (Lewin 1970) Sly et al. 1998

Species of bacterium

Flavilitoribacter nigricans is a gram-negative protein bacterium from the family Lewinellaceae which has been isolated from beach sand near Lagos in Nigeria. It is the only species in the genus Flavilitoribacter.
