= Cortical remapping =

Neurological process

Cortical remapping, also referred to as cortical reorganization, is the process by which an existing cortical map is affected by a stimulus resulting in the creation of a 'new' cortical map. Every part of the body is connected to a corresponding area in the brain which creates a cortical map. When something happens to disrupt the cortical maps such as an amputation or a change in neuronal characteristics, the map is no longer relevant. The part of the brain that is in charge of the amputated limb or neuronal change will be dominated by adjacent cortical regions that are still receiving input, thus creating a remapped area. Remapping can occur in the sensory or motor system. The mechanism for each system may be quite different. Cortical remapping in the somatosensory system happens when there has been a decrease in sensory input to the brain due to deafferentation or amputation, as well as a sensory input increase to an area of the brain. Motor system remapping receives more limited feedback that can be difficult to interpret.

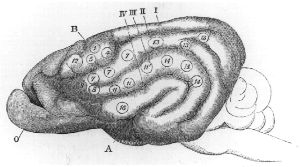
Cortical map representation of a dog by David Ferrier

== History ==
=== Localization ===
Wilder Penfield, a neurosurgeon, was one of the first to map the cortical maps of the human brain. When performing brain surgeries on conscious patients, Penfield would touch either a patient's sensory or motor brain map, located on the cerebral cortex, with an electric probe to determine if a patient could notice either a specific sensation or movement in a particular area on their body. Penfield also discovered that the sensory or motor maps were topographical; areas of the body adjacent to one another would likely be adjacent on the cortical maps.

Due to Penfield's work, the scientific community concluded that the brain must be fixed and unchangeable because a specific area of the brain corresponds to a particular point on the body. However, this conclusion was challenged by Michael Merzenich, whom many call "the world's leading researcher on brain plasticity."

=== Plasticity ===
In 1968, Merzenich and two neurosurgeons, Ron Paul and Herbert Goodman, conducted an experiment to determine effects on the brain after a large bundle of peripheral nerves in adolescent monkeys' hands were cut and began to regenerate again. They knew that the peripheral nervous system could regenerate itself and sometimes during that process the neurons would 'rewire' themselves by accident. These 'wires' would accidentally connect to a different axon, stimulating the wrong nerve. This resulted in a "false localization" sensation; when the patient was touched on a specific area of the body, that touch was actually felt on a different part of the body than expected.

To better understand this phenomenon in the brain, they used micro-electrodes to micromap the monkey's cortical map of its hand. The peripheral nerves were cut and sewn close together to observe evidence of axon 'wires' crossing during regeneration. After seven months, the cortical map of the monkeys' hands were remapped and it was found that the map appeared to be essentially normal, with no 'wire crossing' as expected. They concluded if a cortical map was able to "normalize" itself when stimulated with an irregular input that the adult brain must be plastic.

This experiment helped inspire questioning of the scientific "truth" that the adult brain is fixed and cannot continue to change outside of the critical period, especially by Merzenich. Later in his career, Merzenich conducted an experiment that highlighted the existence of cortical remapping and neuroplasticity. Merzenich and fellow neuroscientist, Jon Kaas, cut the median nerve of a monkey's hand, which delivers sensation to the middle of the hand, to see what the median nerve map would look like when all input was cut off after a period of two months. When the hand was remapped, it was found that when the middle of the hand was touched no activity occurred at the median nerve location. But when the sides of the monkey's hand were touched, activity was found in the median nerve location on the map. This meant that cortical remapping had occurred at the median nerve; the nerves that correlated to the outsides of the monkey's hand had remapped themselves to take over the 'cortical real estate' that was now available due to the median nerve being disconnected.

=== Sensory system ===
Sensory system remapping can potentially self-organize due to the spatiotemporal structure of input. This means that the location and timing of the input is critical for remapping in the sensory system. A study by Gregg Recanzone demonstrates this by seeing if a monkey could distinguish between a stimulus of high and low frequency vibrations, delivered to the tip of its finger at a fixed location. Over time, the monkey got better at identifying the differences in vibration frequency. When the finger was mapped, the map was found to be degraded and unrefined. Because the stimuli were done at a fixed location, everything was excited and therefore selected, resulting in a crude map. The experiment was conducted again except, the location of the high and low vibrations were varied at different parts of the monkey's fingertip. As before, the monkey improved over time. When the monkey's finger was remapped it was found that the crude map from before had been replaced with an elegant map of the fingertip showing all the different places stimulation had occurred on different locations of the fingertip. This study showed that over a period of time, a map could be created from a localized stimulus and then altered by a location variable stimulus.

Cerebrum lobes

=== Motor system ===
Motor system remapping, as compared to sensory system remapping, receives more limited feedback that can be difficult to interpret. When looking at motor system maps, you find that the last pathway for movement to occur in the motor cortex does not actually activate the muscles directly but causes decreased motor neuron activity. This means, there is a possibility that remapping in the motor cortex can come from changes in the brainstem and spinal cord, locations that are difficult to experiment on, due to challenging access.

A study done by Anke Karl helps demonstrate why the motor system may be dependent on the sensory system in regard to cortical remapping. The study found a strong connection between motor and somatosensory cortical remapping after amputation and phantom limb pain. The study assumed that somatosensory cortex reorganization can affect plasticity in the motor system because stimulation of the somatosensory cortex prompts long term potentiation in the motor cortex. The study concluded that reorganization of the motor cortex may only be subsidiary to cortical changes in the somatosensory cortex. This helps support why feedback to the motor system is limited and difficult to determine for cortical remapping.

== Application ==
Cortical remapping helps individuals regain function from injury.

=== Phantom limbs ===
Phantom limbs are sensations felt by amputees that make it feel like their amputated extremity is still there. Sometimes amputees can experience pain from their phantom limbs; this is called phantom limb pain (PLP).

Phantom limb pain is considered to be caused from functional cortical reorganization, sometimes called maladaptive plasticity, of the primary sensorimotor cortex. Adjustment of this cortical reorganization has the potential to help alleviate PLP. One study taught amputees over a two-week period to identify different patterns of electrical stimuli being applied to their stump to help reduce their PLP. It was found that the training reduced PLP in the patients and reversed the cortical reorganisation that had previously occurred.

However, a recent study by Tamar R. Makin suggests that instead of PLP being caused by maladaptive plasticity, it may actually be pain induced. The maladaptive plasticity hypothesis suggests that once afferent input is lost from an amputation, cortical areas bordering the same amputation area will begin to invade and take over the area, affecting the primary sensorimotor cortex, seeming to cause PLP. Makin now argues that chronic PLP may actually be 'triggered' by "bottom-up nociceptive inputs or top-down inputs from pain-related brain areas" and that the cortical maps of the amputation remain intact while the "inter-regional connectivity" is distorted.

=== Stroke ===
The mechanisms involved in stroke recovery mirror those related to brain plasticity. Tim H. Murphy describes it as, "Stroke recovery mechanisms are based on structural and functional changes in brain circuits that have a close functional relationship to those circuits affected by stroke."

Neuroplasticity after a stroke is enabled by new structural and functional circuits that are formed through cortical remapping. A stroke occurs when there is not enough blood flow to the brain, causing debilitating neurological damage. The tissue that surrounds the infarct (stroke damaged area) has reduced blood flow and is called the penumbra. Though the dendrites in the penumbra have been damaged due to the stroke, they can recover during the restoration of blood flow (reperfusion) if done within hours to a few days of the stroke due to time sensitivity. Due to reperfusion in the peri-infarct cortex (found next to the infarct), the neurons can help with active structural and functional remodelling after stroke.

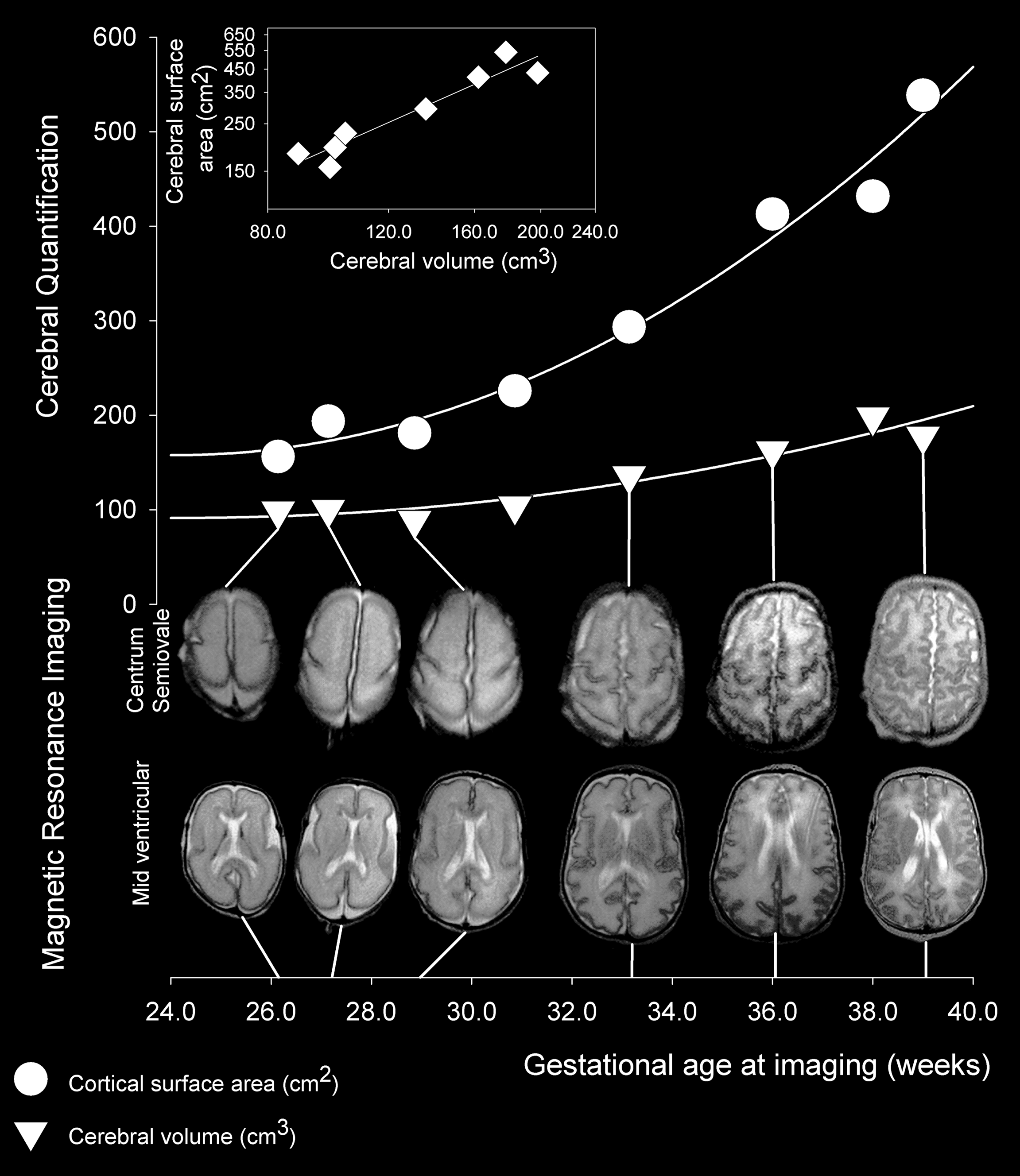
Initial stages of cortical development

Cortical remapping is activity-dependent and competitive. The recovering peri-infarct regions that have bad circuits are competing with healthy tissue for cortical map space. An in vivo study by Murphy was done using mice to help identify the sequence and kinetics of the peri-infarct cortical remapping after stroke. The study showed that eight weeks after a stroke had occurred in the forelimb sensory cortex of a mouse, the 'surviving' portion was able to promptly relay enhanced sensory signals to the motor cortex, which resulted in the remapping of sensory function. The mouse that experienced a stroke had remapped responses that lasted longer and spread farther from the motor cortex than those of the control. This means that recovery of the sensorimotor functions after stroke and cortex remodeling suggests changes in the temporal and spatial spread of sensory information.

A model for stroke recovery suggested by Murphy, involves beginning with homeostatic mechanisms (neurons receive proper amount of synaptic input) at the start of stroke recovery. This will restart activity in stroke-affected areas through structural and functional circuit changes. Activity-dependent synaptic plasticity can then strengthen and refine circuits when some of the sensory and motor circuitry is spared. Regions of the brain with partial function can have their circuits recover over a few days to weeks through remapping.

Cortical remapping after a stroke is comparable to initial brain development. For example, remapping that occurs in motor recovery after a stroke is similar to an infant learning skilled movement patterns. Though this is very important information on developing recovery plans for stroke patients, it is important to keep in mind that the circuitry of a stroke patient is quite different from that of a developing brain, and could be less receptive.

== See also ==
- Michael M. Merzenich
