= Cortical map =

Area of the brain cortex with specific function

Cortical maps are collections (areas) of minicolumns in the brain cortex that have been identified as performing a specific information processing function (texture maps, color maps, contour maps, etc.).

== The sensory systems ==
Cortical organization, especially for the sensory systems, is often described in terms of maps. For example, sensory information from the foot projects to one cortical site and the projections from the hand target in another site. As the result of this somatotopic organization of sensory inputs to the cortex, cortical representation of the body resembles a map (or homunculus).

In the late 1970s and early 1980s, several groups began exploring the impacts of removing portions of the sensory inputs. Michael Merzenich and Jon Kaas and Doug Rasmusson used the cortical map as their dependent variable. They found—and this has been since corroborated by a wide range of labs—that if the cortical map is deprived of its input it will become activated at a later time in response to other, usually adjacent inputs. At least in the somatic sensory system, in which this phenomenon has been most thoroughly investigated, JT Wall and J Xu have traced the mechanisms underlying this plasticity. Re-organization is not cortically emergent, but occurs at every level in the processing hierarchy; this produces the map changes observed in the cerebral cortex.

Merzenich and William Jenkins (1990) initiated studies relating sensory experience, without pathological perturbation, to cortically observed plasticity in the primate somatosensory system, with the finding that sensory sites activated in an attended operant behavior increase in their cortical representation. Shortly thereafter, Ford Ebner and colleagues (1994) made similar efforts in the rodent whisker barrel cortex (also somatic sensory system). These two groups largely diverged over the years. The rodent whisker barrel efforts became a focus for Ebner, Matthew Diamond, Michael Armstrong-James, Robert Sachdev, Kevin Fox and great inroads were made in identifying the locus of change as being at cortical synapses expressing NMDA receptors, and in implicating cholinergic inputs as necessary for normal expression. However, the rodent studies were poorly focused on the behavioral end, and Ron Frostig and Daniel Polley (1999, 2004) identified behavioral manipulations as causing a substantial impact on the cortical plasticity in that system.

Merzenich and DT Blake (2002, 2005, 2006) went on to use cortical implants to study the evolution of plasticity in both the somatosensory and auditory systems. Both systems show similar changes with respect to behavior. When a stimulus is cognitively associated with reinforcement, its cortical representation is strengthened and enlarged. In some cases, cortical representations can increase two to threefold in 1–2 days at the time at which a new sensory motor behavior is first acquired, and changes are largely finished within at most a few weeks. Control studies show that these changes are not caused by sensory experience alone: they require learning about the sensory experience, and are strongest for the stimuli that are associated with reward, and occur with equal ease in operant and classical conditioning behaviors.

An interesting phenomenon involving cortical maps is the incidence of phantom limbs (see Ramachandran for review). This is most commonly described in people that have undergone amputations in hands, arms, and legs, but it is not limited to extremities. The phantom limb feeling, which is thought to result from disorganization in the brain map and the inability to receive input from the targeted area, may be annoying or painful. Incidentally, it is more common after unexpected losses than planned amputations. There is a high correlation with the extent of physical remapping and the extent of phantom pain. As it fades, it is a fascinating functional example of new neural connections in the human adult brain.

Norman Doidge, following the lead of Michael Merzenich, separates manifestations of neuroplasticity into adaptations that have positive or negative behavioral consequences. For example, if an organism can recover after a stroke to normal levels of performance, that adaptiveness could be considered an example of "positive plasticity". An excessive level of neuronal growth leading to spasticity or tonic paralysis, or an excessive release of neurotransmitters in response to injury which could kill nerve cells; this would have to be considered a "negative" plasticity. In addition, drug addiction and obsessive-compulsive disorder are deemed examples of "negative plasticity" by Dr. Doidge, as the synaptic rewiring resulting in these behaviors is also highly maladaptive.

A 2005 study found that the effects of neuroplasticity occur even more rapidly than previously expected. Medical students' brains were imaged during the period when they were studying for their exams. In a matter of months, the students' gray matter increased significantly in the posterior and lateral parietal cortex.

== See also ==
- Cortical remapping
