= Lewinella =

Scientific classification
- Domain: Bacteria
- Kingdom: Pseudomonadati
- Phylum: Bacteroidota
- Class: Saprospiria
- Order: Saprospirales
- Family: Lewinellaceae
- Genus: Lewinella; Sly et al. 1998

Species
- Lewinella agarilytica Lewinella antarctica Lewinella aquimaris Lewinella cohaerens Lewinella lacunae Lewinella lutea Lewinella marina Lewinella maritima Lewinella persica Lewinella xylanilytica

Genus of bacteria

Lewinella is a Gram-negative, chemoorganotrophic and aerobic genus from the family Lewinellaceae.
