= Phaeodactylibacter =

Scientific classification
- Domain: Bacteria
- Kingdom: Pseudomonadati
- Phylum: Bacteroidota
- Class: Saprospiria
- Order: Saprospirales
- Family: Lewinellaceae
- Genus: Phaeodactylibacter; Chen et al. 2014

Type species
- Phaeodactylibacter xiamenensis

Species
- P. luteus P. xiamenensis

Genus of bacteria

Phaeodactylibacter is a genus of gram-negative bacteria from the family Lewinellaceae.
