= Barrel cortex =

Region of the somatosensory cortex in some rodents and other species

Identifiers
- NeuroLex ID: nlx_81

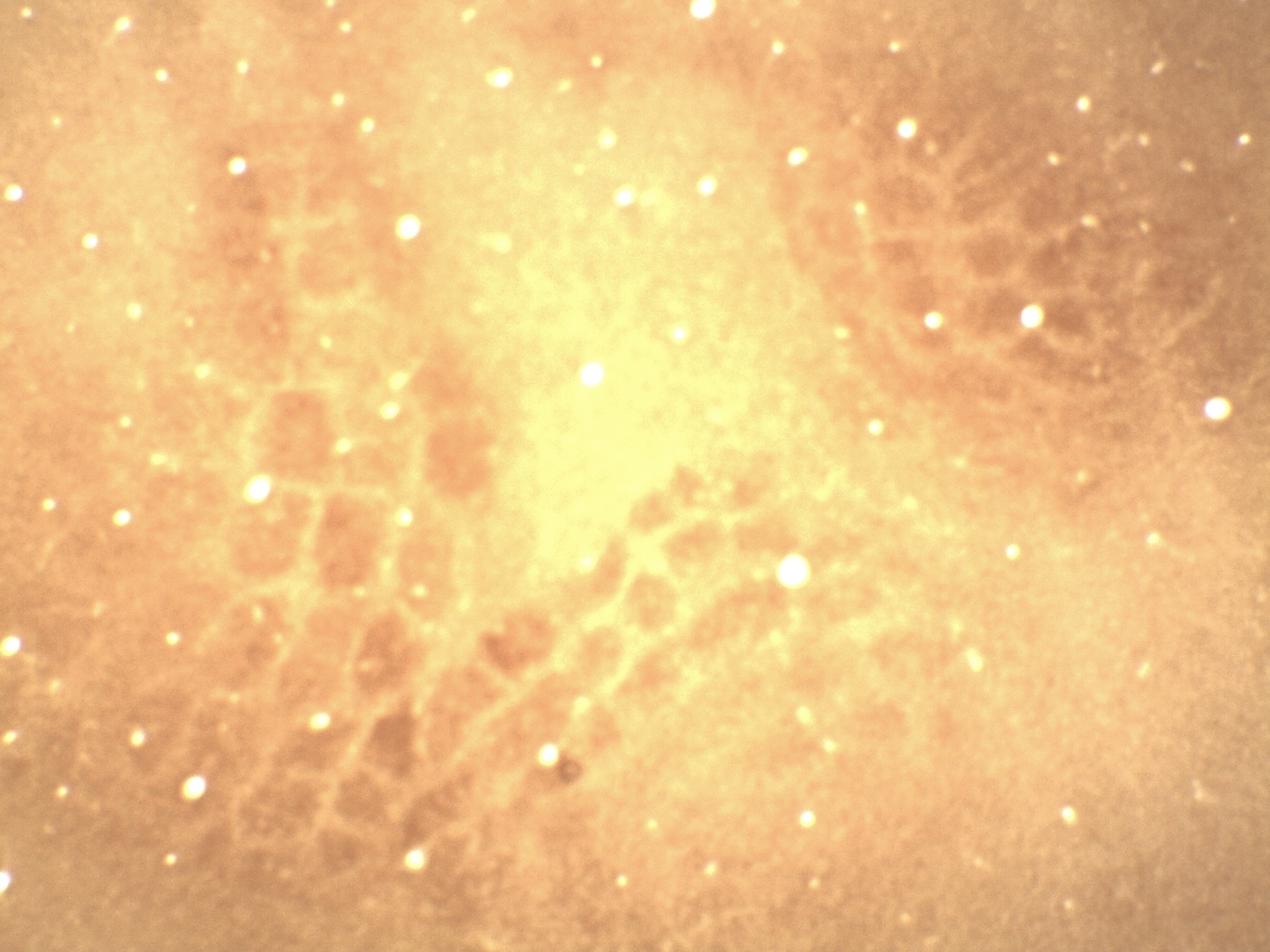
Pictomicrograph shows the barrel field in layer IV of the rat somatosensory cortex. Each barrel receives input from one whisker. The tissue in the image has been stained with cytochrome oxidase and is 50μm thick.

The barrel cortex is a region of the somatosensory cortex that is identifiable in some species of rodents and species of at least two other orders and contains the barrel field. The 'barrels' of the barrel field are regions within cortical layer IV that are visibly darker when stained to reveal the presence of cytochrome c oxidase and are separated from each other by lighter areas called septa. These dark-staining regions are a major target for somatosensory inputs from the thalamus, and each barrel corresponds to a region of the body. Due to this distinctive cellular structure, organisation, and functional significance, the barrel cortex is a useful tool to understand cortical processing and has played an important role in neuroscience. The majority of what is known about corticothalamic processing comes from studying the barrel cortex, and researchers have intensively studied the barrel cortex as a model of neocortical column.

The most distinctive aspect of the barrel field are the whisker barrels. These structures were first discovered by Woolsey and Van der Loos in 1970. Staining in the whisker barrels is more distinct than that in other areas of the somatosensory cortex. Recognizing that the array was similar to that of the vibrissae (whiskers) on the mystacial pad (region where whiskers grow from) of certain mammals, they hypothesized that the barrels were the "cortical correlates of the mystacial vibrissae" and that "one barrel represents one vibrissa". Whereas small non-whisker areas of barrel cortex correspond to large and sometimes overlapping areas of the body, each much larger whisker barrel corresponds to a single whisker. As a result, the whisker barrels are the focus of the majority of barrel cortex research, and 'barrel cortex' is often used to refer primarily to the whisker barrels. Consequently, much of this article focuses on rodent whisker barrel cortex.

== Organisation of the barrel fields ==
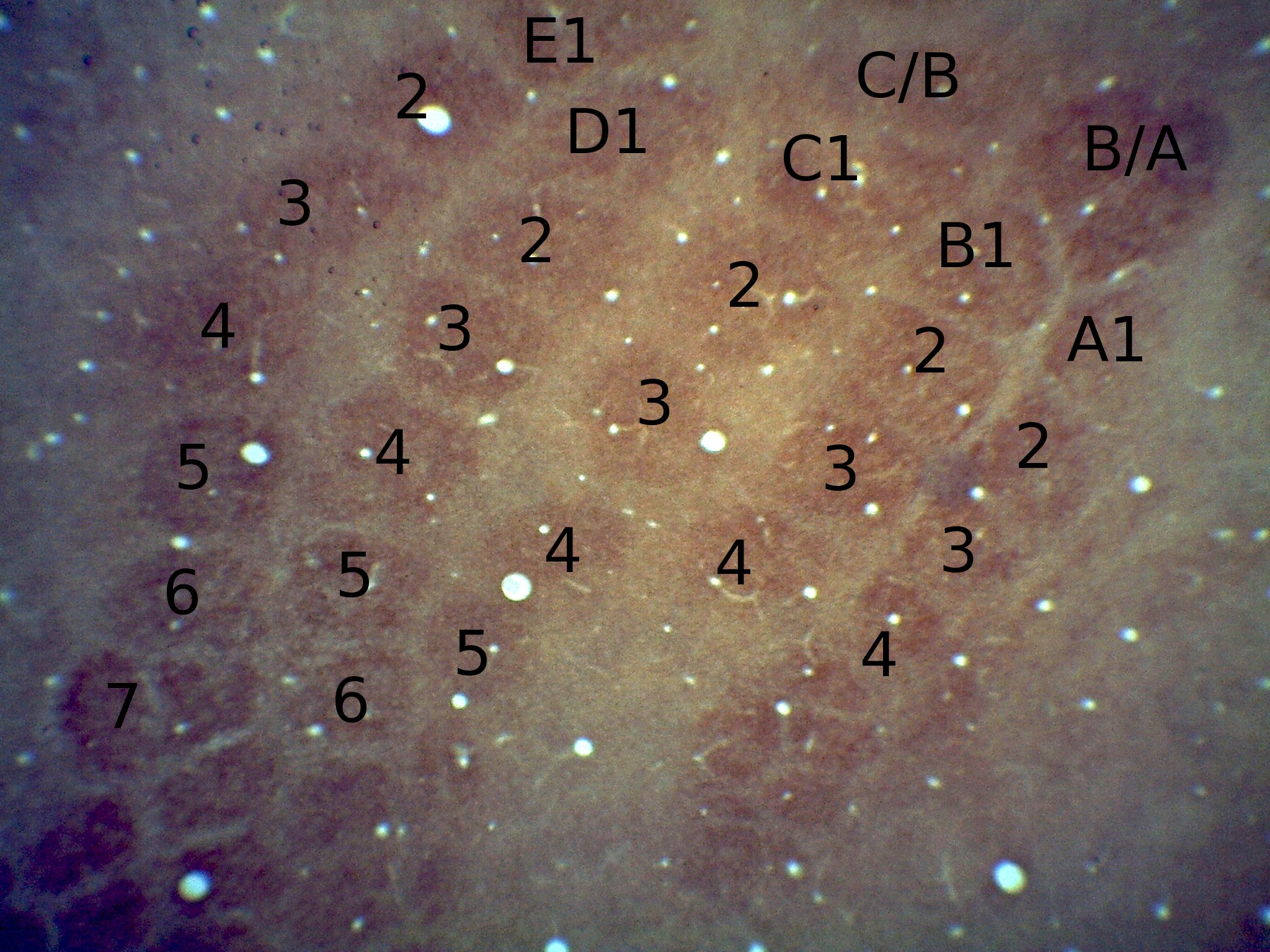
Pictomicrograph shows the posteromedial barrel subfield in layer IV of the rat somatosensory cortex. Barrels in the PMBSF are particularly large and distinct. The tissue in the image has been stained with cytochrome oxidase and is 50μm thick.

The barrel field, like many regions of cortex, is organised into a topographic map. In the case of the barrel field, the map is somatotopic - based on the arrangement of body parts. Areas corresponding to the nose and mouth are more rostral and lateral in the map, the forelimb, hindlimb and trunk are more medial, with the forelimb rostral of the hindlimb, and the whisker barrel subfields - the posteromedial barrel subfield, which corresponds to the major facial whiskers (the mystacial vibrissae), and the anteriolateral barrel subfield, which corresponds to the smaller whiskers of the face - are caudal and lateral. Although the whiskers make up a relatively small portion of the animal, they dominate the somatotopic map.

=== Barrels of the major facial whiskers ===
The barrels that correspond to the major facial whiskers (mystacial vibrissae) are contained within the posteromedial barrel subfield (PMBSF). The barrels here are the largest and most elliptical in shape and have a striking topographical organization that is identical to that of the whiskers; they are organized into 5 rows of 4-7 large whiskers that run close to parallel with the bridge of the nose. The organisation of the mystacial vibrissae and corresponding barrels is so consistent that there is a naming convention to identify each whisker in rats and mice. Rows are designated A to E from top to bottom, and columns of whiskers within each row are numbered from back to front. The first four rows also have an additional whisker behind column 1, which is designated with a lower case letter or a Greek letter (α, β, γ, or δ). These four whiskers are also called straddlers.

== Anatomy and connectivity of the barrels ==
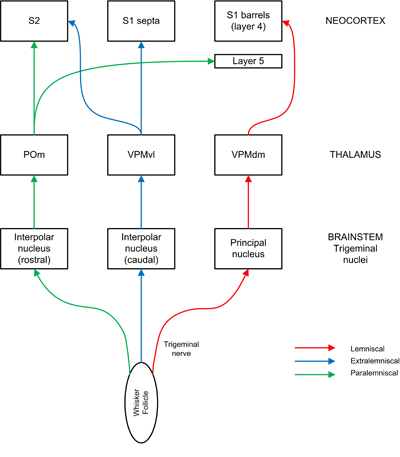
Sensory information flows in parallel pathways from whiskers to cortex.

The barrels of the barrel cortex were named because the densities of cells resembled barrels. That is, they are collected into cylindrical shapes that are narrowed at the top and bottom. The centre of the barrel is designated the hollow, and the spaces between the barrels are the septa (singular: septum).

Sensory information flows from whisker follicles to barrel cortex via the trigeminal nerve nuclei and the thalamus. Barrel-like divisions can be seen in some, but not all parts of the trigeminal nuclei (where they are called barrelets) and the thalamus (where they are called barreloids). The trigeminal nerve carries afferent fibres from the follicles into the brainstem where they connect to neurons in four different trigeminal nerve nuclei: principal, interpolar, oral, and caudal.

Projections from the trigeminal nuclei to the thalamus are split into pathways designated lemniscal, extralemniscal, and paralemniscal. In the lemniscal pathway, axons from the principal trigeminal nucleus cross over the midline and project to “barreloids” in the thalamus, specifically in the dorsomedial section of the ventroposterior medial nucleus (VPMdm). Neurons in VPMdm project mainly to barrels in layer 4 of primary somatosensory cortex (S1). In the extralemniscal pathway, neurons of the interpolar nucleus project to the ventrolateral section of the ventroposterior medial nucleus (VPMvl). Neurons in VPMvl project to septa between the barrels and to secondary somatosensory cortex (S2). The paralemniscal pathway runs from the interpolar trigeminal nucleus via the posterior nucleus (POm) of the thalamus to S2 and to diffuse targets in barrel cortex, especially layer 5.

Each pathway also has secondary projections to other layers within barrel cortex and other regions of cortex, including motor cortex. These different pathways are thought to transmit different modalities of sensory information from the whisker.

== Whisker barrel neurophysiology ==
The whisker barrel cortex contains different types of neurons that receive input from a range of sources that themselves receive and process an array of different types of information. As a result, neurons of the whisker barrel cortex respond to whisker-related input, but in a way that is specific to the neurons type and location. This can manifest in different ways. The simplest way is whether the cortical neuron responds only to the deflection of one whisker, or to the deflection of many whiskers. Neurons in layer 4 barrels tend to strongly or exclusively respond to one whisker, while neurons in other layers are less strongly tuned and can respond to multiple whiskers. Neurons that respond to the deflection of multiple whiskers typically have a primary whisker, to which they respond the most. The difference in response magnitude between deflection of the primary whisker and secondary whiskers can also vary between neurons. Stimulation of multiple whiskers may produce a response that is equal to the sum of the responses if each whisker was stimulated independently, or it may be different. Some neurons show greater responses when multiple neurons are stimulated in sequence, and the sequence may be direction specific.

As well as combinations of which whiskers have been stimulated, neurons may also respond to specific types of whisker stimulation. The simplest response, seen in neurons within the layer IV barrel cortex, directly code for whisker displacement. That is to say, that the neuron within a given barrel will fire when the whisker that barrel represents is moved at a rate that is roughly proportional to the angular displacement of the neuron. These neurons also show directional sensitivity; certain neurons will only fire when the whisker is moved in a specific direction. Deflection-based firing neurons can sustain their response throughout the deflection of the whisker. Other neurons respond to the initial deflection, but then quickly return to their previous level of activity. Much of this activity is also modulated by the behaviour of the animal - rats and mice actively move their whiskers to explore their environment, and the response of a neuron to a particular stimulus can vary depending on what the animal is doing.

== Experience-dependent plasticity ==
Because the barrel cortex has a well-organised structure that relates clearly to the whisker pad, it has been used extensively as a tool to study sensory processing and development, and the phenomenon of experience-dependent plasticity - changes in the activity, connectivity, and structure of neural circuits in response to experience. Neurons in the barrel cortex exhibit the property of synaptic plasticity that allows them to alter the vibrissae to which they respond depending on the rodent's history of tactile experience. Experience-dependent plasticity is commonly studied in the barrel cortex by partially depriving it of sensory input, either by lesioning elements of the afferent pathway (e.g. the trigeminal nerve) or by ablating, plucking, or trimming some of the facial whiskers. The anatomical structure of the barrels is only affected by lesioning elements of the pathway, but innocuous forms of deprivation can induce rapid changes in the cortical map into adulthood, without any corresponding changes in the barrel structures. Because of their different effects, it seems these two paradigms work by different mechanisms.

Some forms of plasticity in the barrel cortex display a critical period. Plucking whiskers in neonatal rats causes a long-lasting expansion of the representation of the spared whisker in layer 4. However, layer 4 plasticity rapidly diminishes if sensory deprivation begins after day 4 of life (P4) whereas representations in layer 2/3 remain highly plastic into adulthood.

Two cortical processes run alongside each other when barrel cortex is deprived of sensory input from some whiskers to produce representational plasticity. In deprived cortex, neuronal responses to spared whiskers are enhanced and responses to deprived whiskers are weakened. These two processes have different time courses, with the weakening of deprived response preceding the strengthening of spared response, implying that they have different underlying mechanisms. These two effects combine to produce an expansion of the cortical representation of spared whiskers into the representation of adjacent deprived whiskers.

It is likely that several different mechanisms are involved in producing experience-dependent plasticity in a whisker deprivation protocol (adapted from Feldman and Brecht, 2005 ):

1. Almost immediately, loss of input to a deprived barrel column leads to a loss of inhibitory firing in that column. This unmasks horizontal excitatory connections from adjacent spared columns. This does not explain longer-lasting plastic changes as the unmasking would disappear immediately if the deprived input was reinstated (for example by allowing the whisker to regrow).
2. LTP- and LTD-like processes also seem to be involved. This can be inferred by using transgenic mice where there are changes in the expression of enzymes related to LTP and LTD e.g. calmodulin-dependent protein kinase II (CaMKII) or cyclic-AMP response element binding protein (CREB). In these mice, plasticity is compromised Spike timing rather than frequency may be an important factor. Associative LTP has been demonstrated at layer 4 to layer 2/3 synapses when the layer 4 neuron fires 0-15 ms before the layer 2/3 neuron, and LTD is observed when this timing order is reversed. Such mechanisms could act rapidly to produce plastic changes within hours or days.
3. Sensory deprivation has been demonstrated to cause changes in synaptic dynamics such as EPSP amplitude and frequency. The net effect of these changes is to increase the proportion of synaptic input which layer 2/3 neurons in deprived barrels receive from spared barrels. These observations suggest that other, more specific, mechanisms besides LTP/LTD are at play in experience-dependent plasticity.
4. It seems intuitively likely that structural changes at the level of axons, dendrite branches, and dendrite spines underlie some of the long-term plastic changes in the cortex. Changes in axon structure have been reported in plasticity following lesions and more recently by studies using whisker trimming. Dendritic branching is important during prenatal and neonatal development, is involved in plasticity induced by lesions, but is not involved in experience-dependent plasticity. In vivo two-photon microscopy reveals that dendritic spines in mouse barrel cortex are highly dynamic and subject to continuous turnover, and may be associated with formation or deletion of synapses. It is likely that spine turnover is necessary but not sufficient to produce experience-dependent plasticity, and other mechanisms such as axonal remodelling are also needed to explain features such as savings from prior experience.

Plasticity and remodelling of barrel cortex has also been studied in the context of traumatic brain injury, where environmental enrichment of stimuli has been shown to induce plasticity/recovery and patterns of temporal coding have been altered via plasticity and recovery mechanisms.
