= Rubidimonas =

Scientific classification
- Domain: Bacteria
- Kingdom: Pseudomonadati
- Phylum: Bacteroidota
- Class: Saprospiria
- Order: Saprospirales
- Family: Saprospiraceae
- Genus: Rubidimonas; Yoon et al. 2012

Type species
- Rubidimonas crustatorum

Species
- R. crustatorum

Genus of bacteria

Rubidimonas is a genus from the family of Saprospiraceae with one known species (Rubidimonas crustatorum).
