= Tamar Makin =

Israeli professor of neuroscience

- תמר מייקין
- Education: Hebrew University of Jerusalem; University of Oxford
- Scientific career
- Workplaces: University of Cambridge; University College London; MRC Cognition and Brain Sciences Unit
- Thesis: Multisensory representation of peri-hand space (2009)

Tamar Makin (Hebrew: תמר מייקין) is a Professor of Cognitive Neuroscience at the MRC Cognition and Brain Sciences Unit. She is interested in brain plasticity, that is––how the brain adapts to changes in the body, with a focus on motor control and augmentation.

== Early life and education ==
Makin studied at the Hebrew University of Jerusalem. She was awarded Fellowship to study brain plasticity at the University of Oxford, where she was eventually made a principal investigator.

== Research and career ==
In 2016, Makin joined the faculty at University College London, where she was made a professor of Cognitive Neuroscience. Her research considers brain plasticity. At UCL, Makin studied how artificial limbs were represented in the brains of people with amputations. She moved to the University of Cambridge in 2022, where was awarded a European Research Council Starting Grant.

Makin is a professor of Cognitive Neuroscience in the Medical Research Council Cognition and Brain Unit. Makin studies how the human brain represents the body and how these representations change following disability, injury, or technological augmentation. Makin combines neuroscience, psychology, rehabilitation and bioengineering research to help people benefit from brain plasticity.

== Selected publications ==
- Tamar R Makin; Nicholas P Holmes; H Henrik Ehrsson (7 March 2008). "On the other hand: dummy hands and peripersonal space". Behavioural Brain Research. 191 (1): 1–10. doi:10.1016/j.bbr.2008.02.041. ISSN 0166-4328. PMID 18423906. Wikidata Q37142736.
- Tamar R Makin; Nicholas P. Holmes; Ehud Zohary (1 January 2007). "Is that near my hand? Multisensory representation of peripersonal space in human intraparietal sulcus". The Journal of Neuroscience. 27 (4): 731–740. doi:10.1523/jneurosci.3653-06.2007. ISSN 0270-6474. PMC 6672897. PMID 17251412. Wikidata Q48298721.
- Tamar R Makin; Jan Scholz; Nicola Filippini; David Henderson Slater; Irene Tracey; Heidi Johansen-Berg (1 January 2013). "Phantom pain is associated with preserved structure and function in the former hand area". Nature Communications. 4: 1570. Bibcode:2013NatCo...4.1570M. doi:10.1038/ncomms2571. ISSN 2041-1723. PMC 3615341. PMID 23463013. Wikidata Q36736894.
