= Whiskers =

Type of animal hair used for sensing

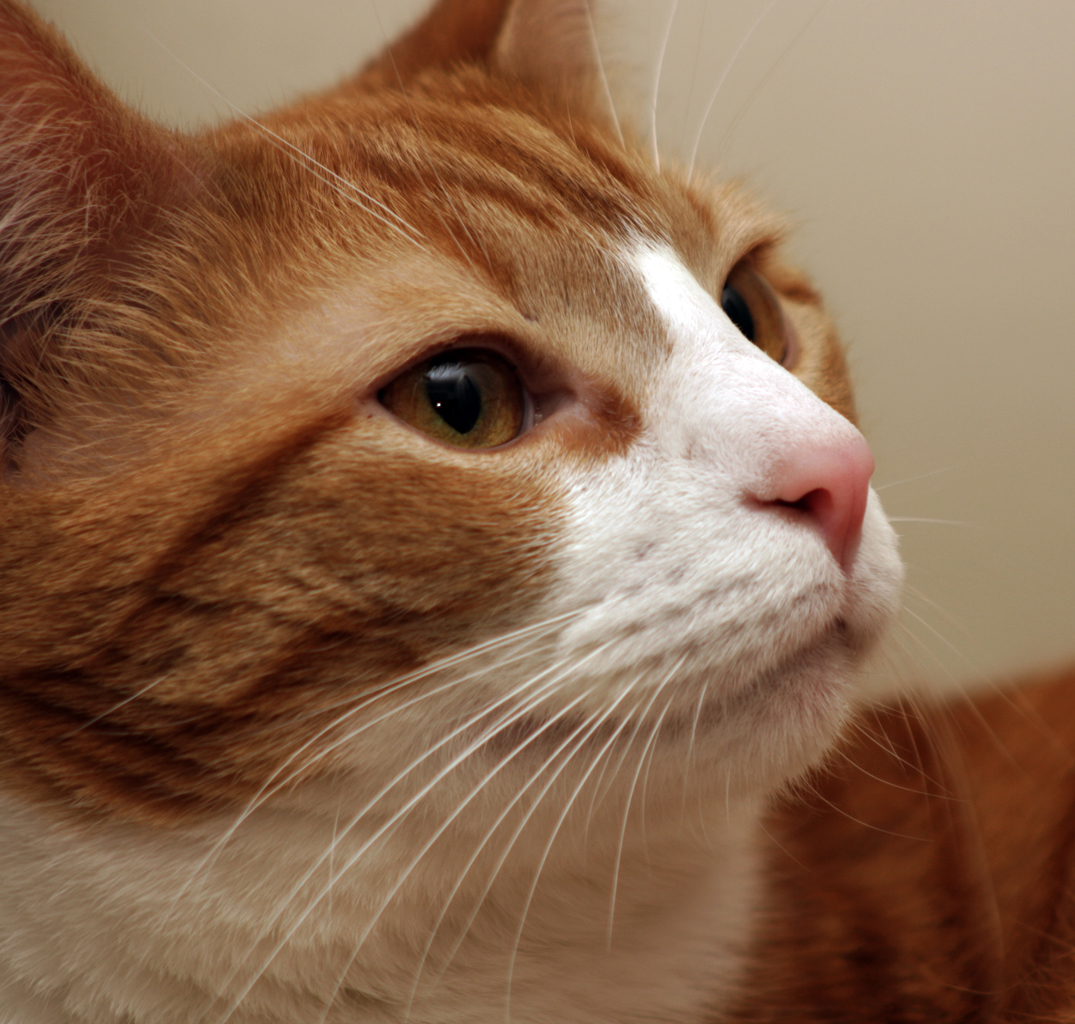
A cat with whiskers

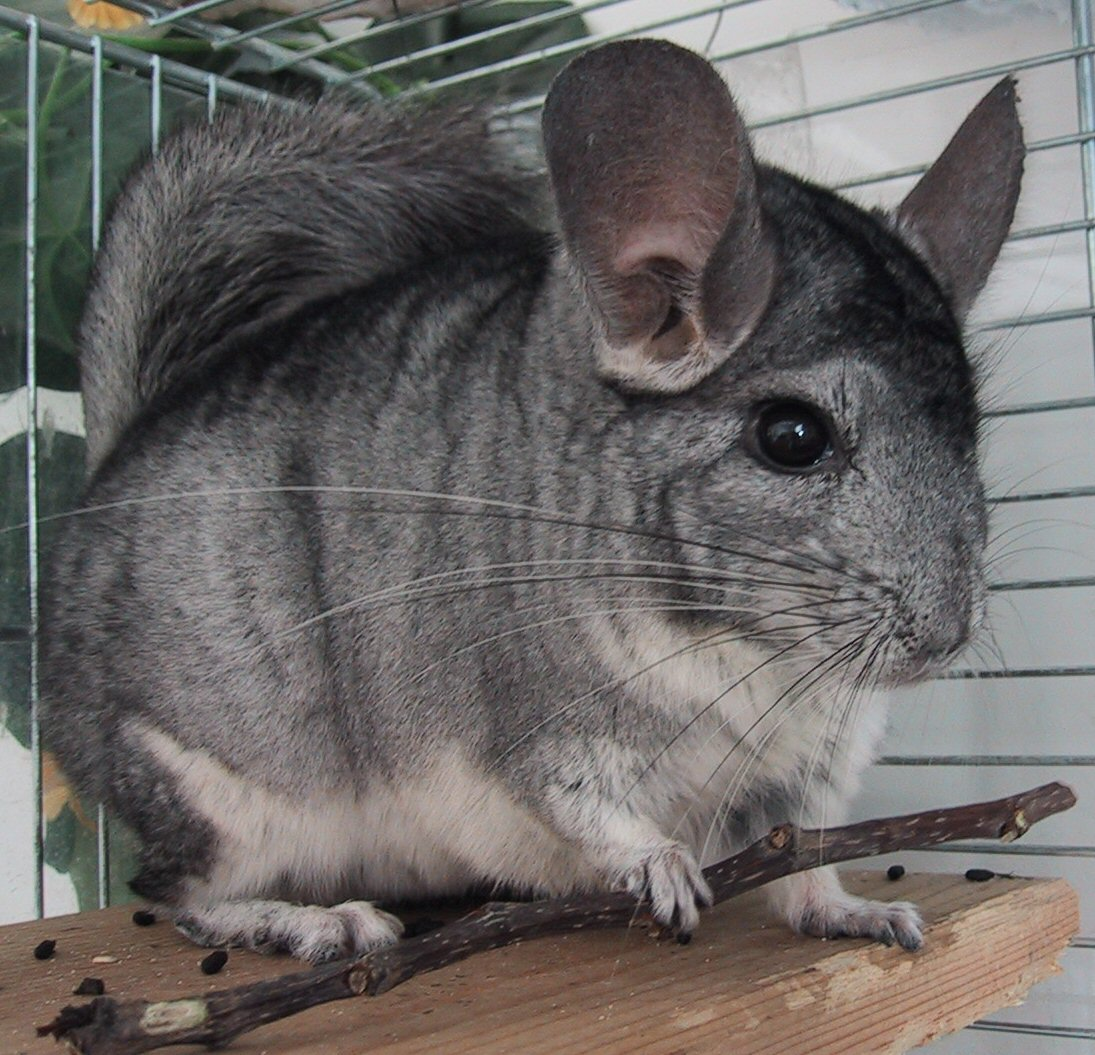
A chinchilla with large macrovibrissae

Whiskers, also known as vibrissae (/vəˈbrɪsi/; sing. vibrissa; /vəˈbrɪsə/), are specialized sensory hairs that help most species of mammals sense their environment. Whiskers function as highly sensitive feelers that help mammals navigate the world in many different ways, including the detection of air currents and physical objects to aid in navigation, hunting, and spatial awareness. Whiskers can trigger reflexes to protect the eyes. Whiskers also play a significant role in the communication between individual animals in different species of mammals. They convey an animal's emotional state, essentially sending a message to other members of their species about what emotion they are feeling at the time. Whisker movement can be thought of as a form of language that animals use to silently communicate with the other animals around them.

Whiskers grow in clusters at various places around the body, including above the eyes, on the chin, on the forelegs, near the ears, and above the upper lip. Most mammals have whiskers, including all non-human primates, marsupials, and especially nocturnal mammals. Monotremes, however, lack them.

Whiskers are sensitive tactile hairs that aid navigation, locomotion, exploration, hunting, social touch and perform other functions.

While mammals are the only animals that grow whiskers, other classes of animal species are known to have similar structures that are also used to sense the environment. Species with structures that function similarly to whiskers include different species of birds, fish, insects, crustaceans, and other arthropods.

== Etymology ==
Vibrissae (from Latin vibrāre 'to vibrate') from the characteristic motion seen in a small rodent that is otherwise sitting still. In medicine, the term also refers to the thick hairs found inside human nostrils.

== Evolution ==
The last common ancestor of all extant mammals had vibrissae, and it has been suggested that the trait evolved in the non-mammalian cynodont ancestors of mammals belonging to the clade Prozostrodontia during the Triassic period based on the presence of a infraorbital canal similar to those of modern mammals in members of this group. All other extant mammal species besides great apes retain the same ancestral layout of the whiskers along with the special facial muscles that move them.

== Anatomy ==
Whiskers are anatomically different from other types of hair that mammals grow. In comparison to other types of mammalian hair, whiskers are stiffer, significantly larger in diameter, and are significantly longer than the surrounding fur.

Whiskers have well-innervated follicles, and an identifiable representation in the somatosensory cortex of the brain. The species of mammals that have the greatest amount of whiskers, as well as the longest whiskers, are typically species that are social, arboreal (live in trees), nocturnal, and physically smaller than other mammals. Whiskers of aquatic mammals are the most sensitive. During foraging in complex, dark habitats, whiskers are rapidly moved in a cyclic way, tracing small circles at their tips. This motion, called "whisking" can occur at speeds of 25 Hz in mice, which is one of the fastest movements that mammals can make. Small animals use whisking to position their front paws during locomotion.

=== Vibrissal groups ===
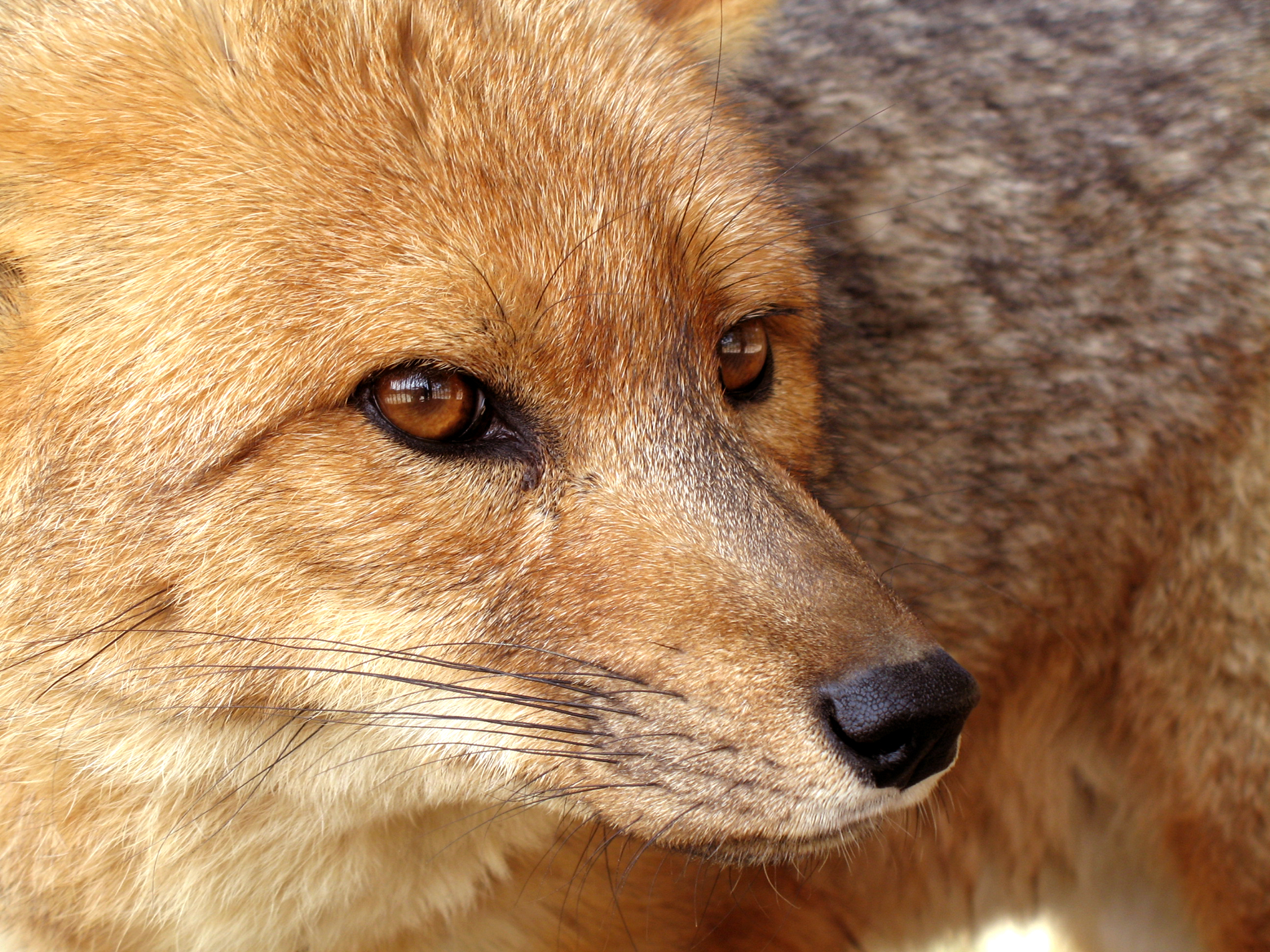
A Patagonian fox showing four major cranial groups of vibrissae: supraorbital (above the eye), mystacial (where a moustache would be), genal (on the cheek, far left), and mandibular (pointing down, under the snout)

Vibrissae typically grow in clusters. These groups vary somewhat in form and function, but they are relatively consistent among land mammals. Between land and marine mammals, there is less consistency (though commonalities are certainly present).

Many land mammals, like rats and hamsters, have four typical whisker groups on their heads (called cranial vibrissae), which might vary among animals due to different lifestyles. These cranial groups include:

- above the eyes (supraorbital)
- on the cheeks (genal)
- where a moustache would be (mystacial)
- under the snout (mandibular).

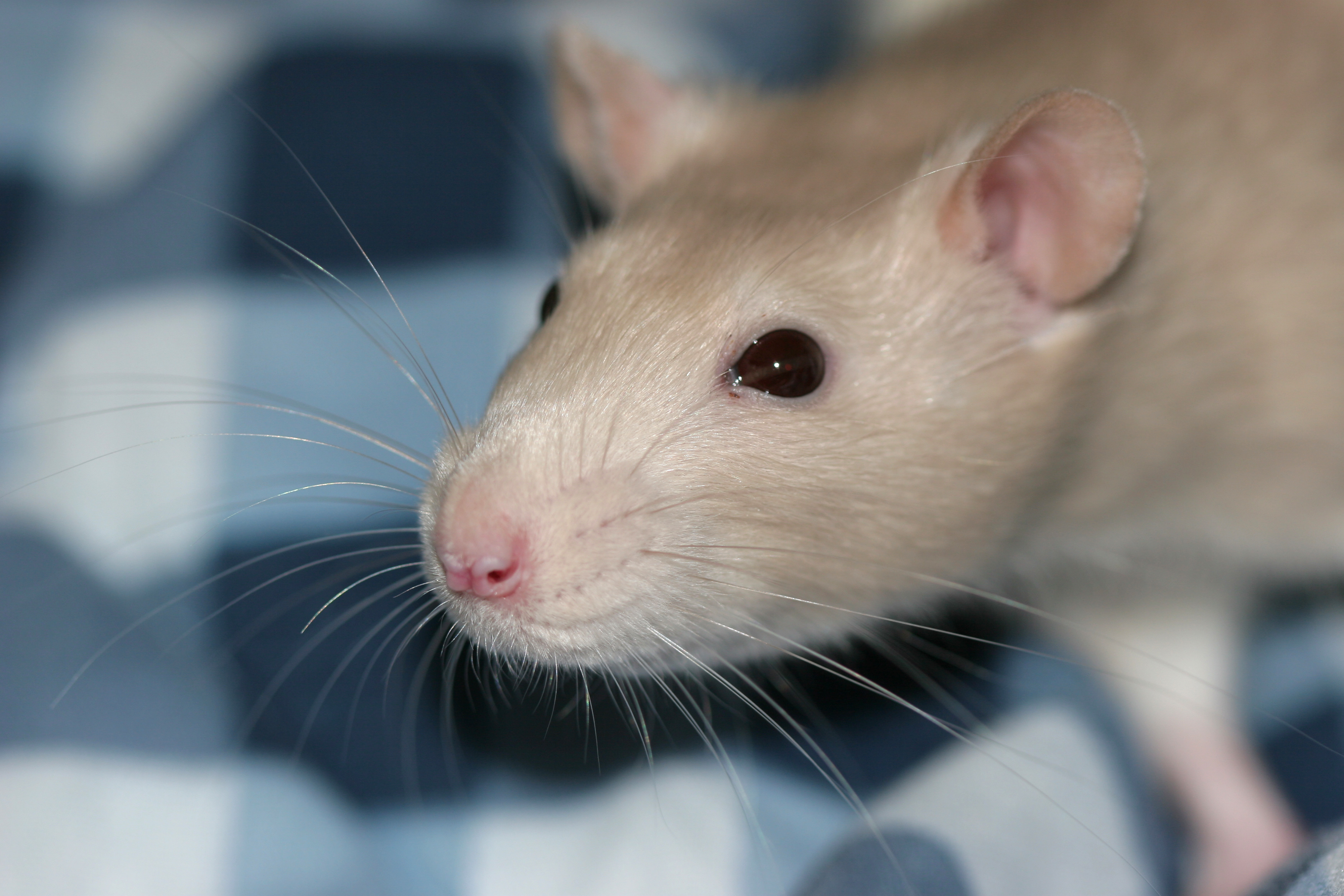
A pet rat clearly showing the grid-like arrangement of the macrovibrissae on the face, and the microvibrissae under the nostrils. The supraorbital vibrissae above the right eye are also visible.

The mystacial whiskers can be roughly identified as macrovibrissae (long whiskers for feeling the space around the head) and microvibrissae (small, down-pointing whiskers for identifying objects). Not only are these two types hard to distinguish on an animal's face (see for example the image of a rat here), there are similarly weak distinctions in how they are used, though the distinction is nonetheless referred to ubiquitously in scientific literature and is considered useful in analysis.

Many land mammals, including domestic cats, also have vibrissae on the underside of the leg just above the paws (called carpal vibrissae). Whilst these five major groups are often reported in studies of land mammals, several other groups have been reported more occasionally; for instance nasal, angular, and submental whiskers.

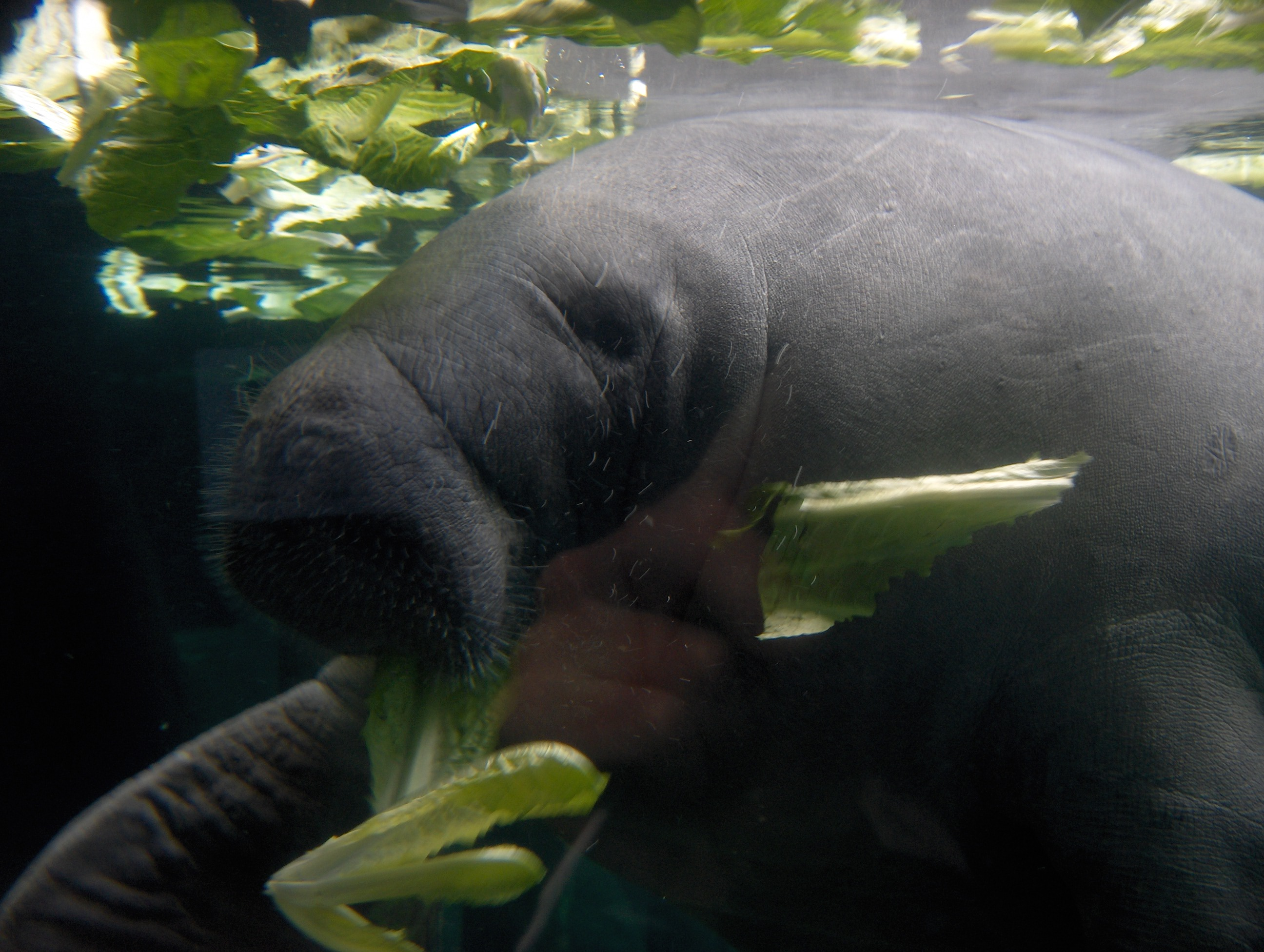
All the hairs of the manatee may be vibrissae.

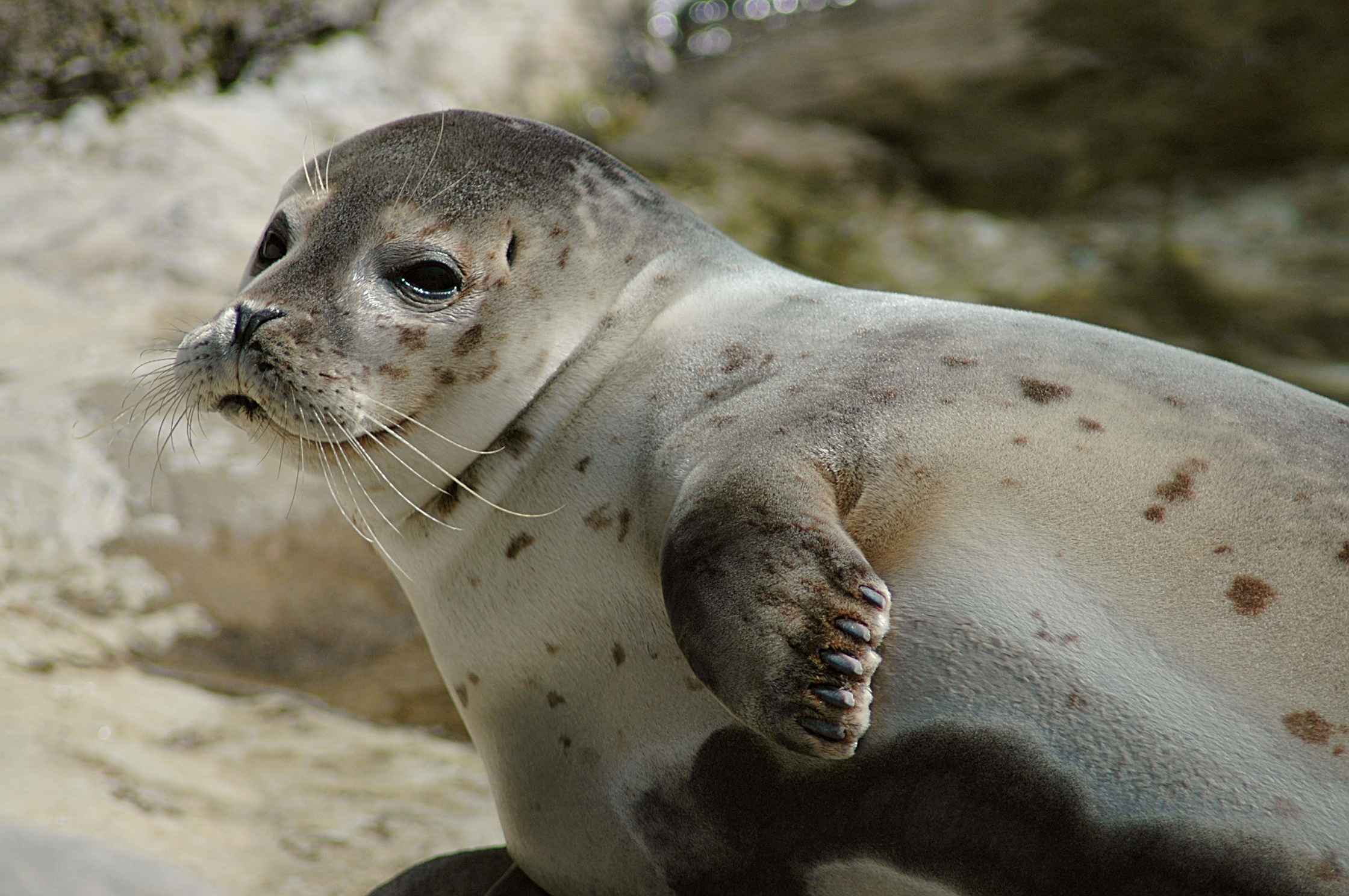
Macrovibrissae and supraorbital vibrissae of the common harbor seal (Phoca vitulina)

Marine mammals can have substantially different arrangements of their vibrissae. For instance, whales and dolphins have lost their snout whiskers and gained vibrissae around their blowholes, whereas every single one of the body hairs of the Florida manatee may be a vibrissa (see image). Other marine mammals, like seals and sea-lions, have head vibrissae just like those on land mammals (see image), although these groups function quite differently.

Vibrissal follicles have evolved other functions in dolphins, such as electroreception.

=== Vibrissae ===
The vibrissal hair is usually thicker and stiffer than other types of (pelagic) hair but, like other hairs, the shaft consists of an inert material (keratin) and contains no nerves. However, vibrissae are different from other hair structures because they grow from a special hair follicle incorporating a capsule of blood called a blood sinus which is heavily innervated by sensory nerves. Vibrissae are symmetrically arranged in groups on the face and supply the trigeminal nerve.

The mystacial macrovibrissae are shared by a large group of land and marine mammals (see images), and it is this group that has received by far the most scientific study. The arrangement of these whiskers is not random: they form an ordered grid of arcs (columns) and rows, with shorter whiskers at the front and longer whiskers at the rear (see images). In the mouse, gerbil, hamster, rat, guinea pig, rabbit, and cat, each individual follicle is innervated by 100–200 primary afferent nerve cells. These cells serve an even larger number of mechanoreceptors of at least eight distinct types. Accordingly, even small deflections of the vibrissal hair can evoke a sensory response in the animal. Rats and mice typically have approximately 30 macrovibrissae on each side of the face, with whisker lengths up to around 50 mm in (laboratory) rats, 30 mm in (laboratory) mice, and a slightly larger number of microvibrissae. Thus, an estimate for the total number of sensory nerve cells serving the mystacial vibrissal array on the face of a rat or mouse might be 25,000. Natural shapes of rat's mystacial pad vibrissae are well approximated by pieces of the Euler spiral. When all these pieces for a single rat are assembled together, they span an interval extending from one coiled domain of the Euler spiral to the other.

Marine mammals may make even greater investment in their vibrissal sensory system than rats and mice. Seal whiskers, which are similarly arrayed across the mystacial region, are each served by around 10 times as many nerve fibres as those in rats and mice, so that the total number of nerve cells innervating the mystacial vibrissae of a seal has been estimated to be in excess of 300,000. Manatees, remarkably, have around 600 vibrissae on or around their lips.

Whiskers can be very long in some species; the length of a chinchilla's whiskers can be more than a third of its body length (see image). Even in species with shorter whiskers, they can be very prominent appendages (see images). Thus, whilst whiskers certainly could be described as "proximal sensors" in contrast to, say, eyes, they offer a tactile sense with a sensing range that is functionally very significant.

== Operation ==
=== Movement ===
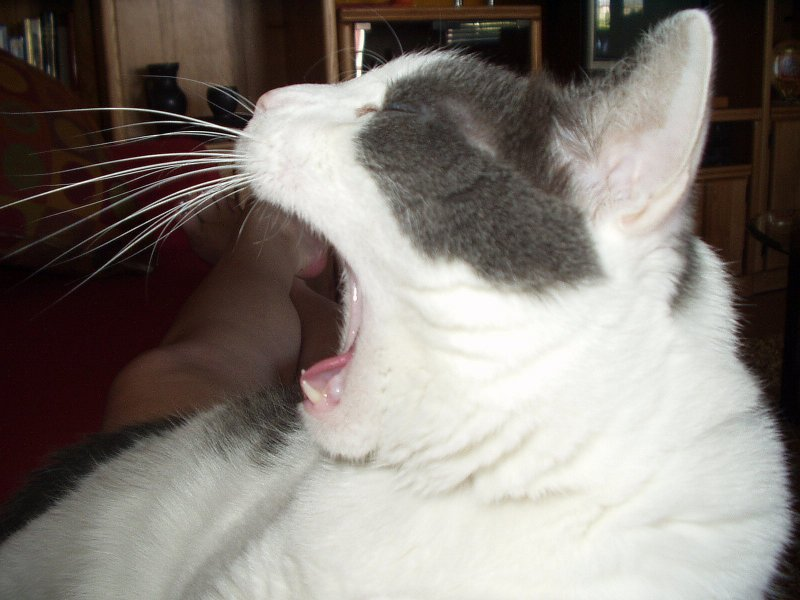
A yawning cat shows how the mystacial macrovibrissae can be swept forward.

The follicles of whiskers that grow on some species of animals are motile, meaning that they are capable of motion. Tiny muscles attached to the base of each whisker allow mammals to move their whiskers and change their position.

Generally, the supraorbital, genal and macrovibrissae are motile, whereas the microvibrissae are not. This is reflected in anatomical reports that have identified musculature associated with the macrovibrissae that is absent for the microvibrissae. A small muscle 'sling' is attached to each macrovibrissa and can move it more-or-less independently of the others, whilst larger muscles in the surrounding tissue move many or all of the macrovibrissae together.

Amongst those species with motile macrovibrissae, some (rats, mice, flying squirrels, gerbils, chinchillas, hamsters, shrews, porcupines, opossums) move them back and forth periodically in a movement known as whisking, while other species (cats, dogs, raccoons, pandas) do not appear to. The distribution of mechanoreceptor types in the whisker follicle differs between rats and cats, which may correspond to this difference in the way they are used. Whisking movements are amongst the fastest produced by mammals. In all whisking animals in which it has so far been measured, these whisking movements are rapidly controlled in response to behavioural and environmental conditions. The whisking movements occur in bouts of variable duration, and they occur at rates between 3 and 25 whisks per second. Movements of the whiskers are closely coordinated with those of the head and body.

=== Function ===
Generally, whiskers are considered to mediate a tactile sense, complementary to that of skin. This is presumed to be advantageous in particular to animals that cannot always rely on sight to navigate or to find food, for example, nocturnal animals or animals which forage in muddy waters. Whiskers can also function as wind detecting antannae, such as the supra-orbital ones in rats.

In addition to their sensory functions, the various movements of whiskers can also indicate an animal's state of mind. This means that different types of whisker movements are associated with different emotions of an animal. An animal may move its whiskers in specific ways to convey emotions such as fear or curiosity. Whiskers play a role in social behavior of many animals, including rats.

The sensory function of vibrissae is an active research area—experiments to establish the capabilities of whiskers use a variety of techniques, including temporary deprivation either of the whisker sense or of other senses. Animals can be deprived of their whisker sense for a period of weeks by whisker trimming (they soon grow back), or for the duration of an experimental trial by restraining the whiskers with a flexible cover like a mask (the latter technique is used, in particular, in studies of marine mammals). Such experiments have shown that whiskers are required for, or contribute to: object localization, orienting of the snout, detection of movement, texture discrimination, shape discrimination, exploration, thigmotaxis, locomotion, maintenance of equilibrium, maze learning, swimming, locating food pellets, locating food animals, and fighting, as well as nipple attachment and huddling in rat pups.

Whisking—the periodic movement of the whiskers—is also presumed to serve tactile sensing in some way. However, exactly why an animal might be driven "to beat the night with sticks", as one researcher once put it, is a matter of debate, and the answer is probably multi-faceted. Scholarpedia offers:

Since rapid movement of the vibrissae consumes energy, and has required the evolution of specialised musculature, it can be assumed that whisking must convey some sensory advantages to the animal. Likely benefits are that it provides more degrees of freedom for sensor positioning, that it allows the animal to sample a larger volume of space with a given density of whiskers, and that it allows control over the velocity with which the whiskers contact surfaces.

Animals that do not whisk, but have motile whiskers, presumably also gain some advantage from the investment in musculature. Dorothy Souza, in her book Look What Whiskers Can Do reports some whisker movement during prey capture (in cats, in this case):

Whiskers bend forward as the cat pounces. Teeth grasp the mouse tightly around its neck. The cat holds on until the prey stops wriggling.

Anecdotally, it is often stated that cats use their whiskers to gauge whether an opening is wide enough for their body to pass through. This is sometimes supported by the statement that the whiskers of individual cats extend out to about the same width as the cat's body, but at least two informal reports indicate that whisker length is genetically determined and does not vary as the cat grows thinner or fatter. In the laboratory, rats are able to accurately (within 5–10%) discriminate the size of an opening, so it seems likely that cats can use their whiskers for this purpose. However, reports of cats, particularly kittens, with their heads firmly stuck in some discarded receptacle are commonplace indicating that if a cat has this information available, it does not always make best use of it.

==== Marine mammals ====
Pinnipeds (commonly known as seals) have well-developed tactile senses. Their mystacial vibrissae have ten times the innervation of terrestrial mammals, allowing them to effectively detect vibrations in the water. These vibrations are generated, for example, when a fish swims through water. Detecting vibrations is useful when the animals are foraging and may add to or even replace vision, particularly in darkness.

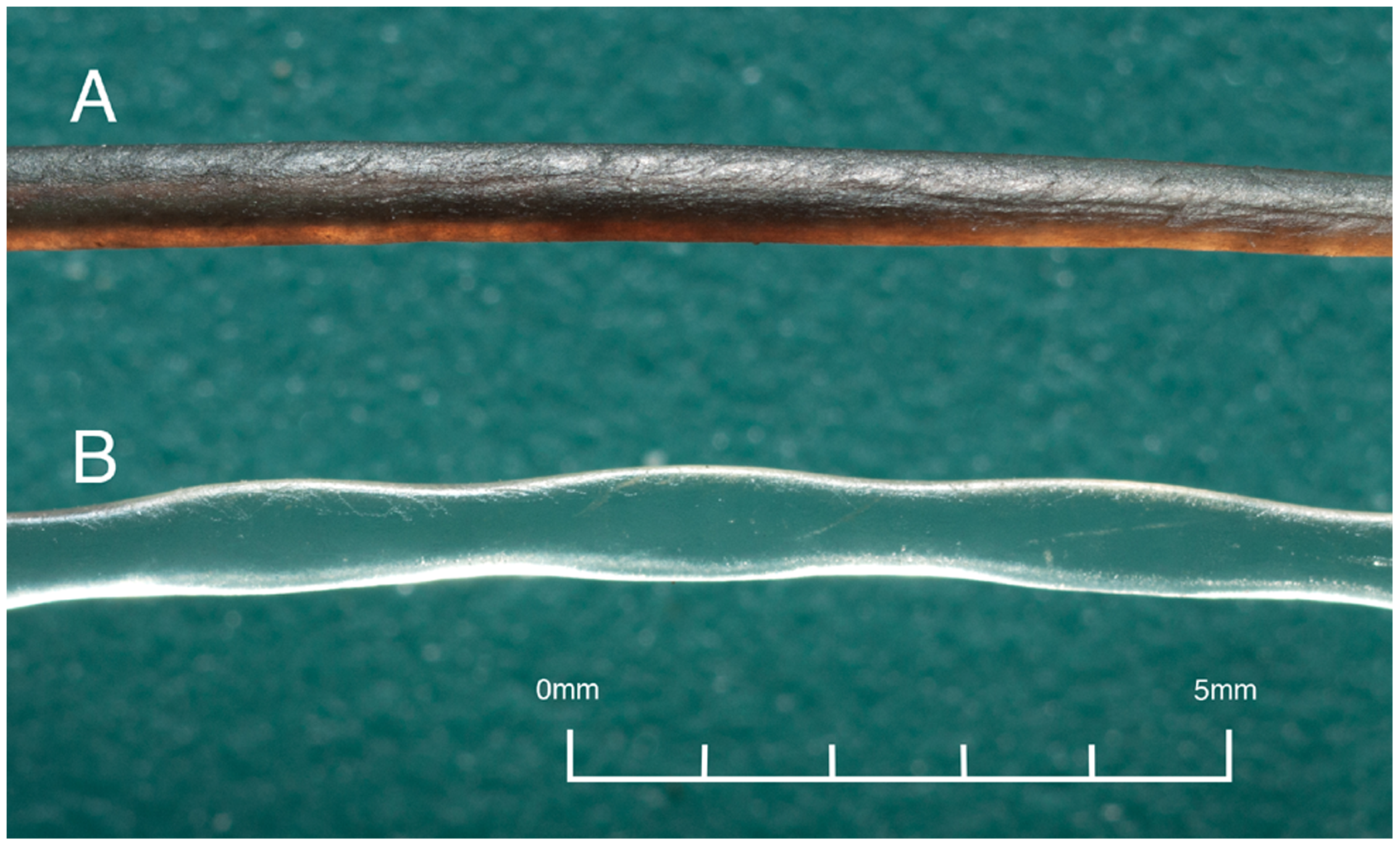
The upper, smooth whisker belongs to a California sea lion. The lower undulated whisker belongs to a harbor seal.

Harbor seals have been observed following varying paths of other organisms that swam ahead several minutes before, similar to a dog following a scent trail, and even to discriminate the species and the size of the fish responsible for the trail. Blind ringed seals have even been observed successfully hunting on their own in Lake Saimaa, likely relying on their vibrissae to gain sensory information and catch prey. Unlike terrestrial mammals, such as rodents, pinnipeds do not move their vibrissae over an object when examining it but instead extend their moveable whiskers and keep them in the same position. By holding their vibrissae steady, pinnipeds are able to maximize their detection ability. The vibrissae of seals are undulated and wavy while sea lion and walrus vibrissae are smooth. Research is ongoing to determine the function, if any, of these shapes on detection ability. The vibrissa's angle relative to the flow, and not the fiber shape, however, seems to be the most important factor.

Most cetaceans have whiskers at birth but they are typically lost during maturation. The follicles and any vestigial hair sometimes function as touch or electrical sense organs.

== Lines of research ==
=== Neuroscience ===
A large part of the brain of whisker-specialist mammals is involved in the processing of nerve impulses from vibrissae, a fact that presumably corresponds to the important position the sense occupies for the animal. Information from the vibrissae arrives in the brain via the trigeminal nerve and is delivered first into the trigeminal sensory complex of brainstem. From there, the most studied pathways are those leading up through parts of thalamus and into barrel cortex, though other major pathways through the superior colliculus in midbrain (a major visual structure in visual animals) and the cerebellum, to name but a couple, are increasingly coming under scrutiny. Neuroscientists, and other researchers, studying sensory systems favour the whisker system for a number of reasons (see Barrel cortex), not least the simple fact that laboratory rats and mice are whisker, rather than visual, specialists.

=== Evolutionary biology ===
The presence of mystacial vibrissae in distinct lineages (Rodentia, Afrotheria, marsupials) with remarkable conservation of operation suggests that they may be an old feature present in a common ancestor of all therian mammals. Indeed, some humans even still develop vestigial vibrissal muscles in the upper lip, consistent with the hypothesis that previous members of the human lineage had mystacial vibrissae. Thus, it is possible that the development of the whisker sensory system played an important role in mammalian development, more generally.

=== Artificial whiskers ===
Researchers have begun to build artificial whiskers of a variety of types, both to help them understand how biological whiskers work and as a tactile sense for robots. These efforts range from the abstract, through feature-specific models, to attempts to reproduce complete whiskered animals in robot form (ScratchBot and ShrewBot, both robots by Bristol Robotics Laboratory).

== In non-mammals ==
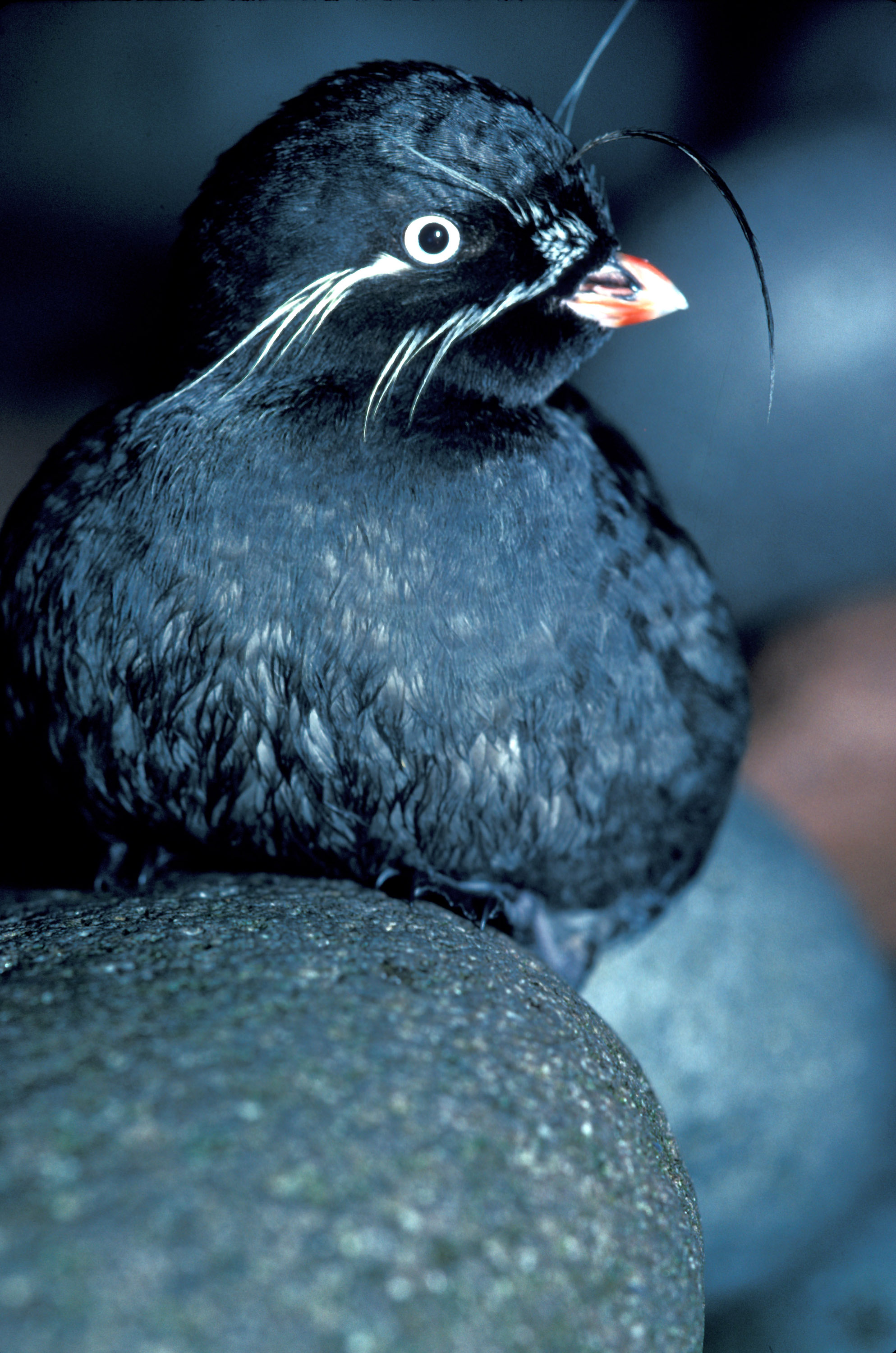
"Whiskers" on a whiskered auklet

Although they are not technically whiskers, a range of non-mammals possess structures which resemble or function similarly to mammalian whiskers.

=== In birds ===
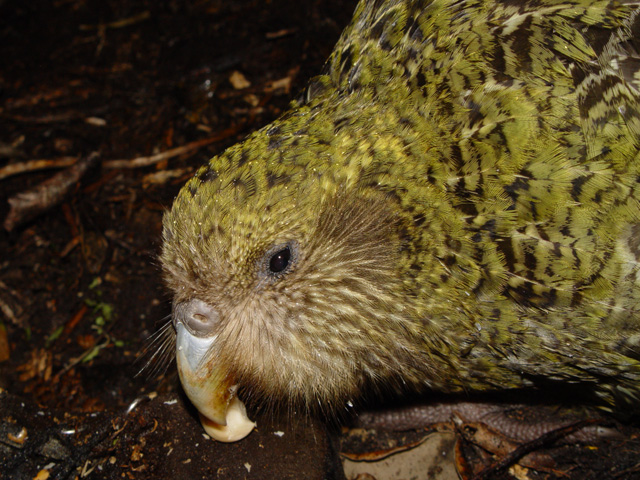
The "whiskers" around the beak of a kākāpō

Some birds possess specialized hair-like feathers called rictal bristles around the base of the beak which are sometimes referred to as whiskers.

The whiskered auklet (Aethia pygmaea) has striking, stiff white feathers protruding from above and below the eyes of the otherwise slate-grey bird, and a dark plume which swoops forward from the top of its head. Whiskered auklets sent through a maze of tunnels with their feathers taped back bumped their heads more than twice as often as they did when their feathers were free, indicating they use their feathers in a similar way to cats.

Other birds that have obvious "whiskers" are kiwis, flycatchers, swallows, nightjars, whip-poor-wills, the kākāpō and the long-whiskered owlet (Xenoglaux loweryi).

=== In fish ===
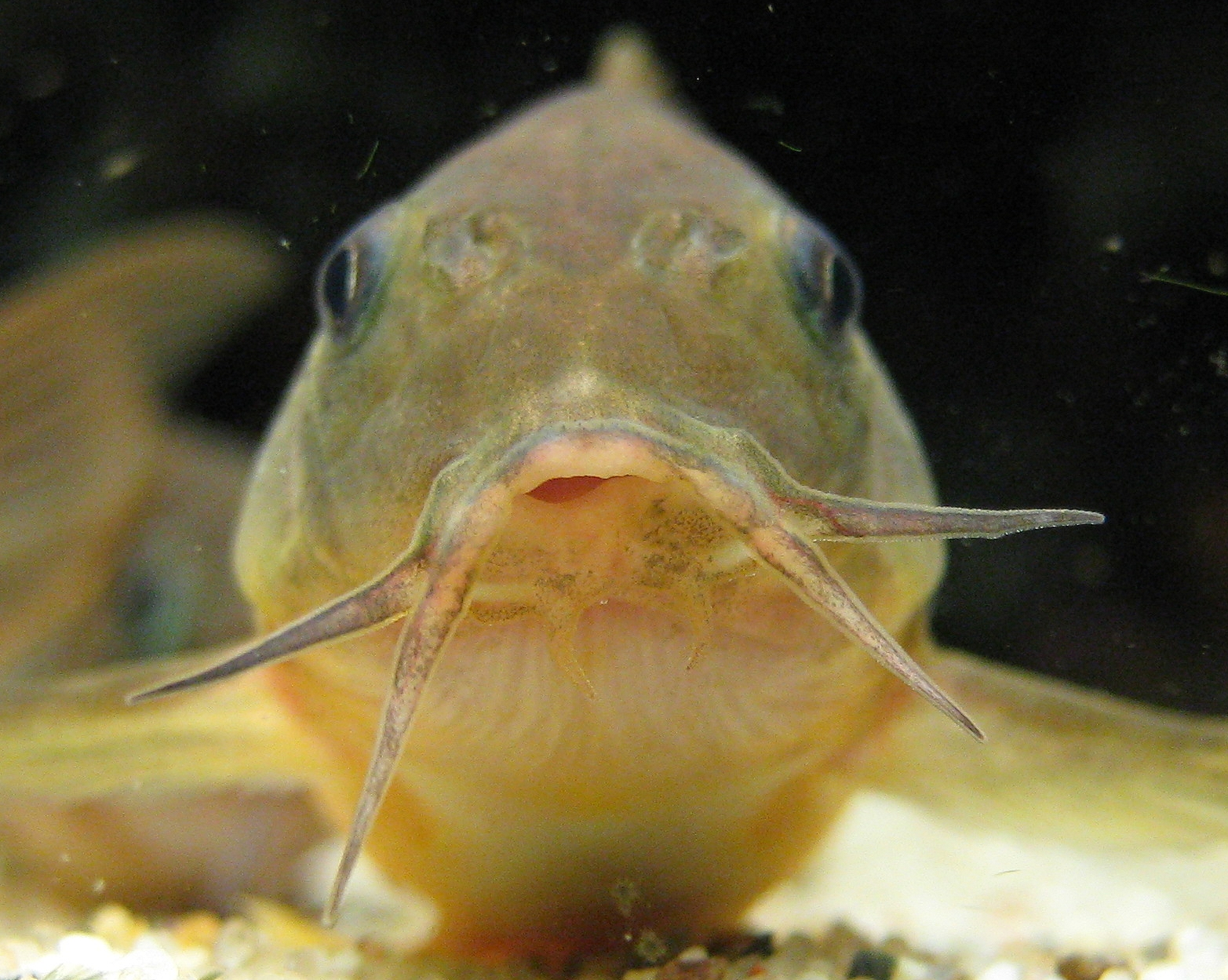
"Whiskers" on a catfish

Some fish have slender, pendulous tactile organs near the mouth. These are often referred to as "whiskers", although they are more correctly termed barbels. Fish that have barbels include the catfish, carp, goatfish, hagfish, sturgeon, zebrafish and some species of shark.

The Pimelodidae are a family of catfishes (order Siluriformes) commonly known as the long-whiskered catfishes.

=== In pterosaurs ===
Anurognathid pterosaurs had a rugose (wrinkled) jaw texture that has been interpreted as the attachment sites for vibrissae, though actual vibrissae have not been recorded. More recently, a specific type of feathers has been found around anurognathid mouths.

== Gallery ==
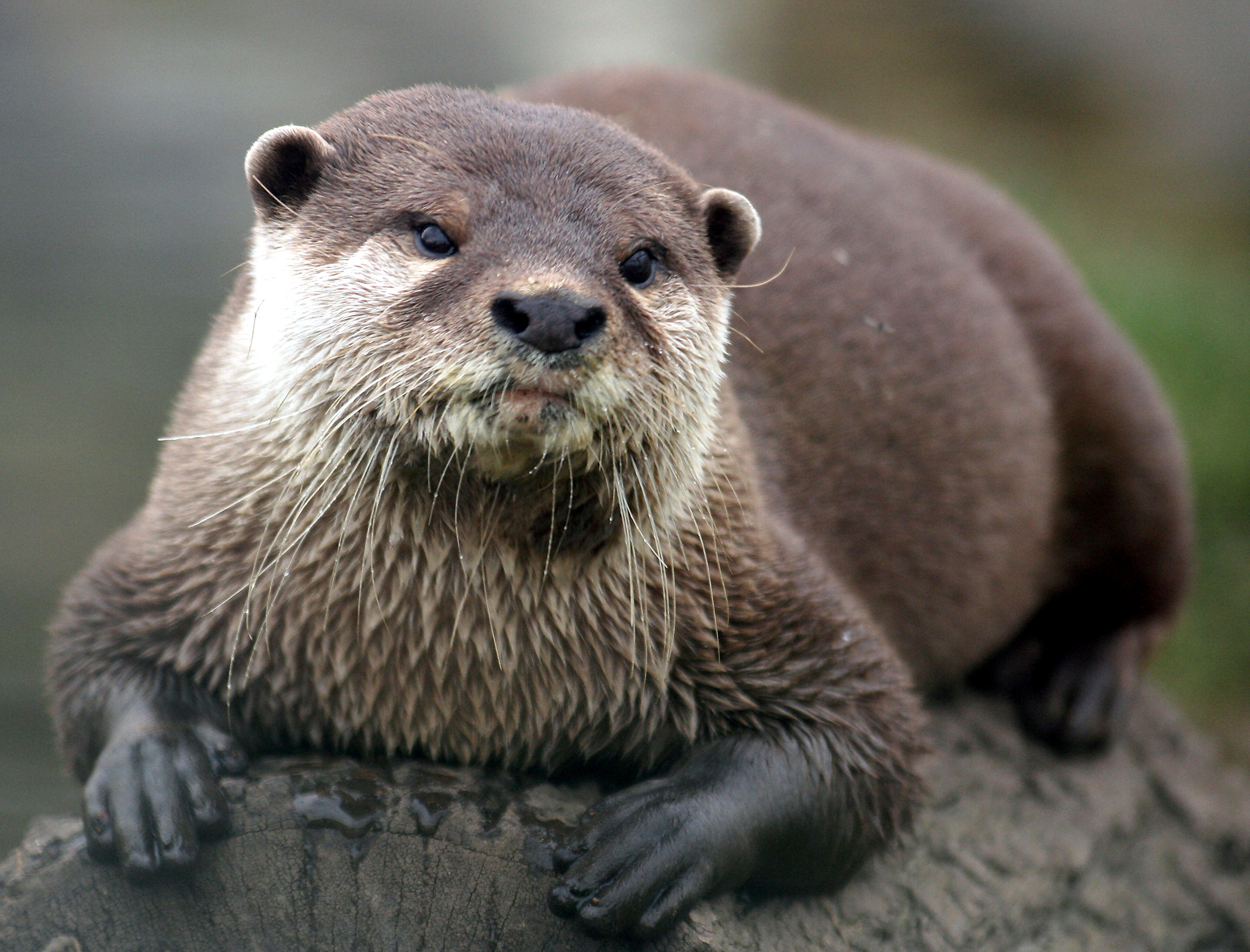
An otter with facial whiskers.

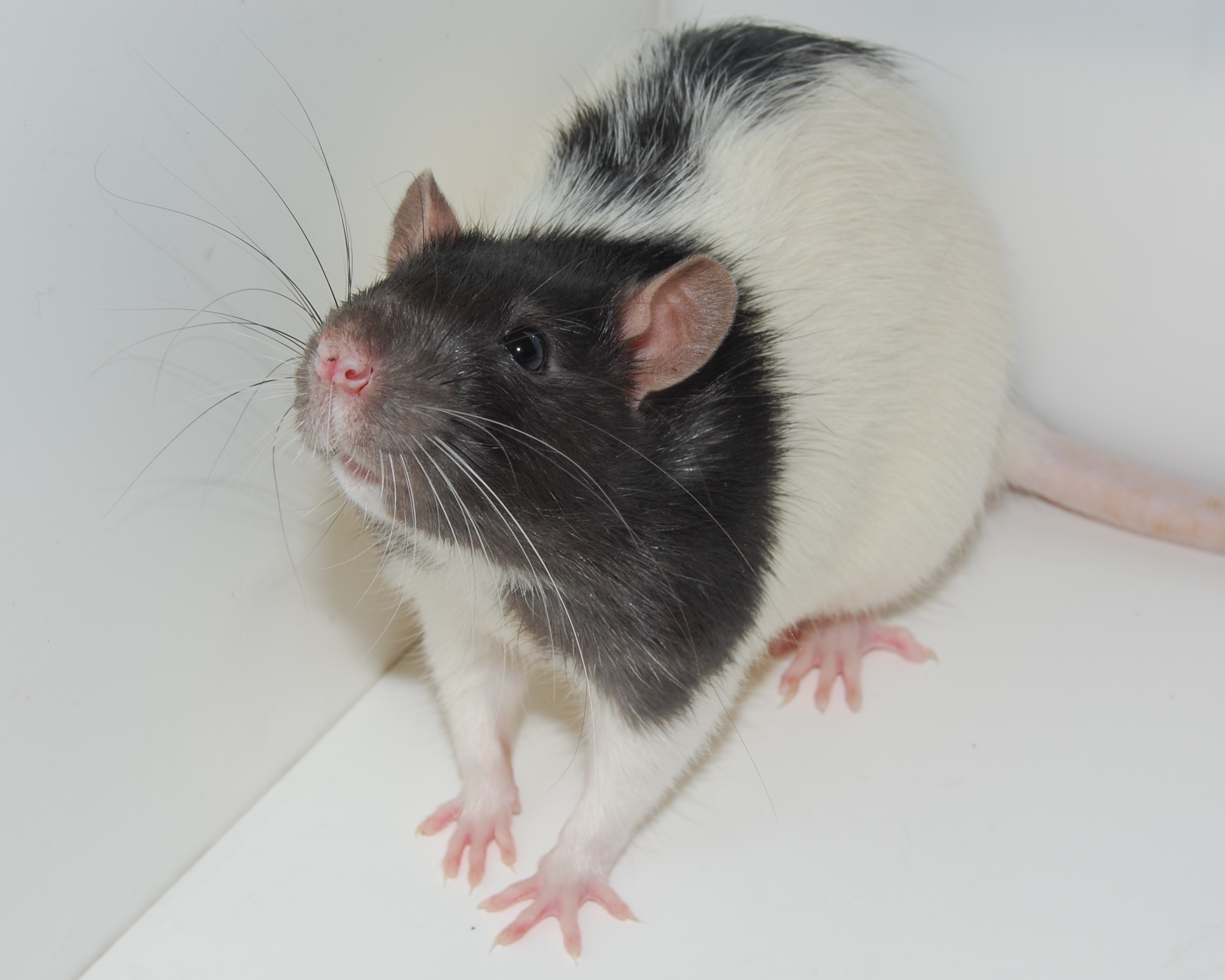
Macrovibrissae of a Lister hooded laboratory rat.

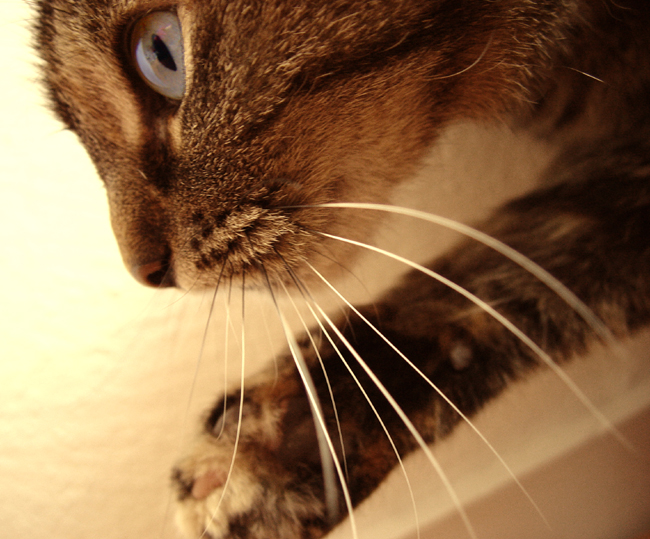
A cat's prominent macrovibrissae.

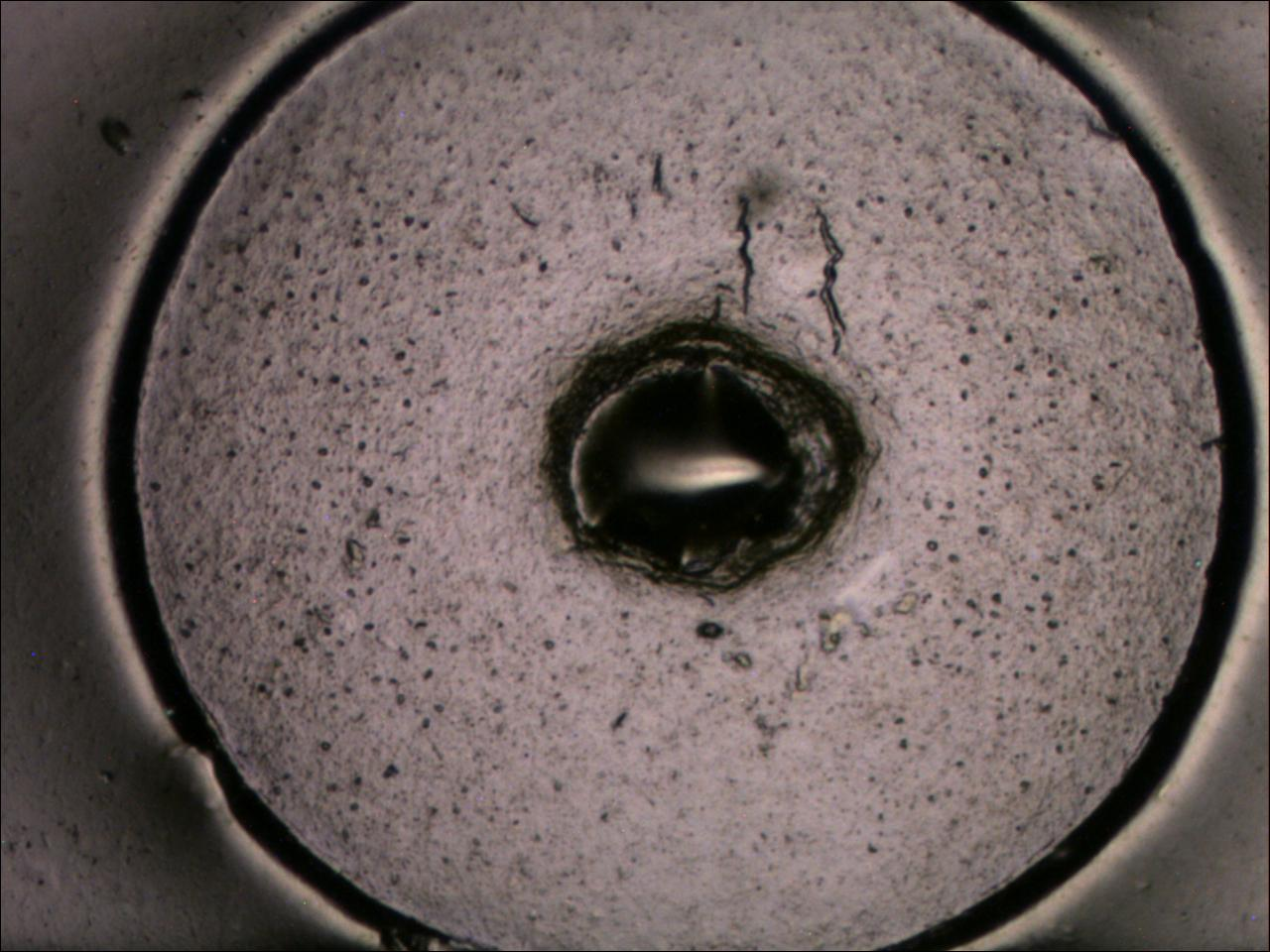
Micrograph cross section of an equine vibrissa.

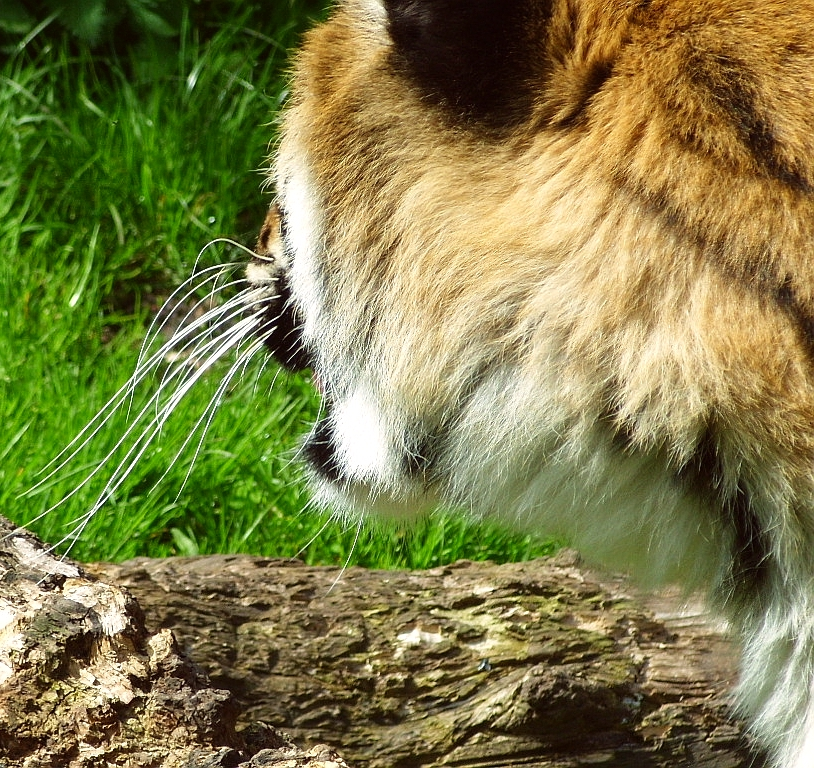
Macrovibrissae of a tiger.

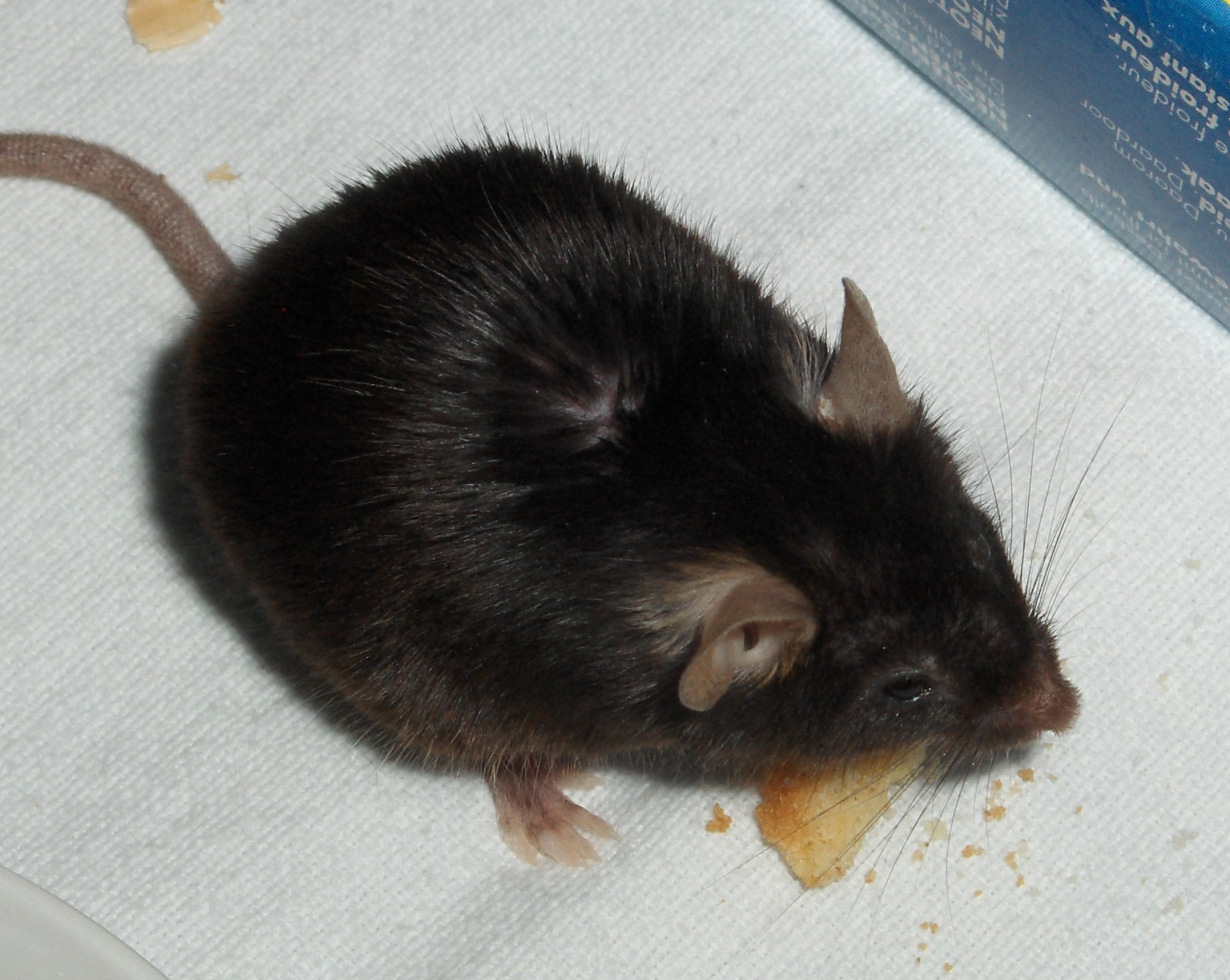
Laboratory mouse (C57BL/6) showing macrovibrissae.

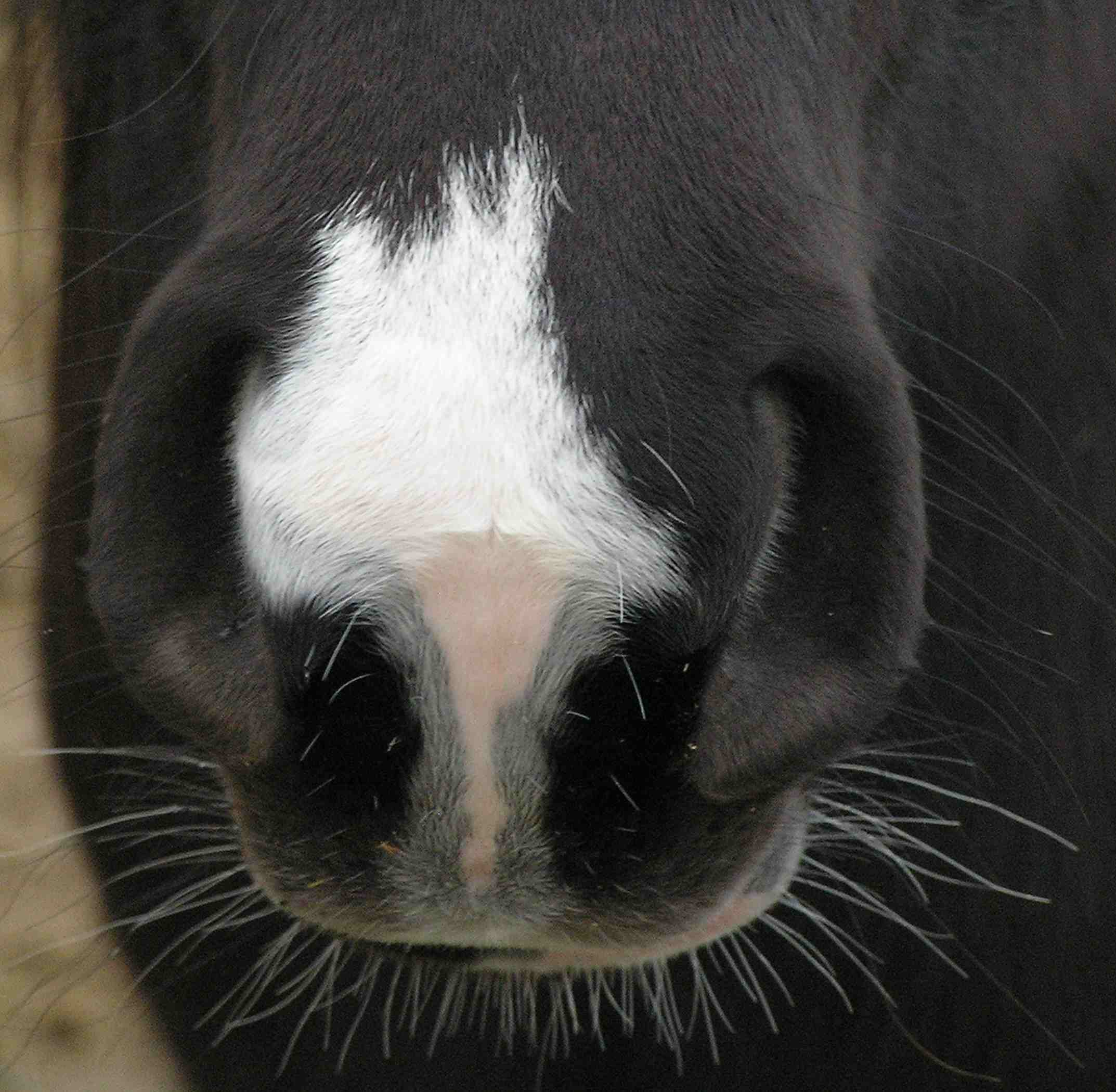
Prominent immotile vibrissae on a horse's muzzle.

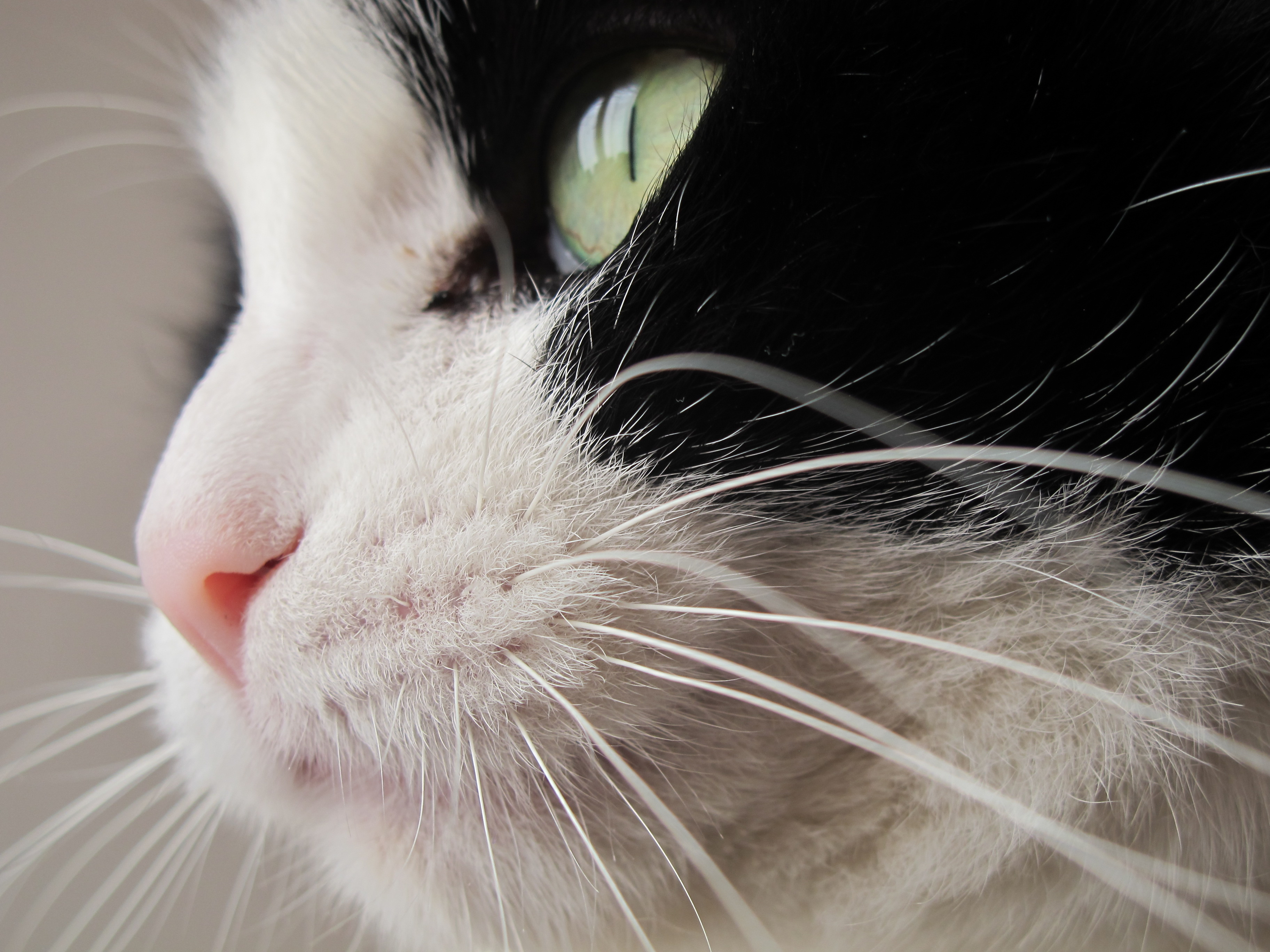
Closeup picture of the vibrissae of a black and white house cat.

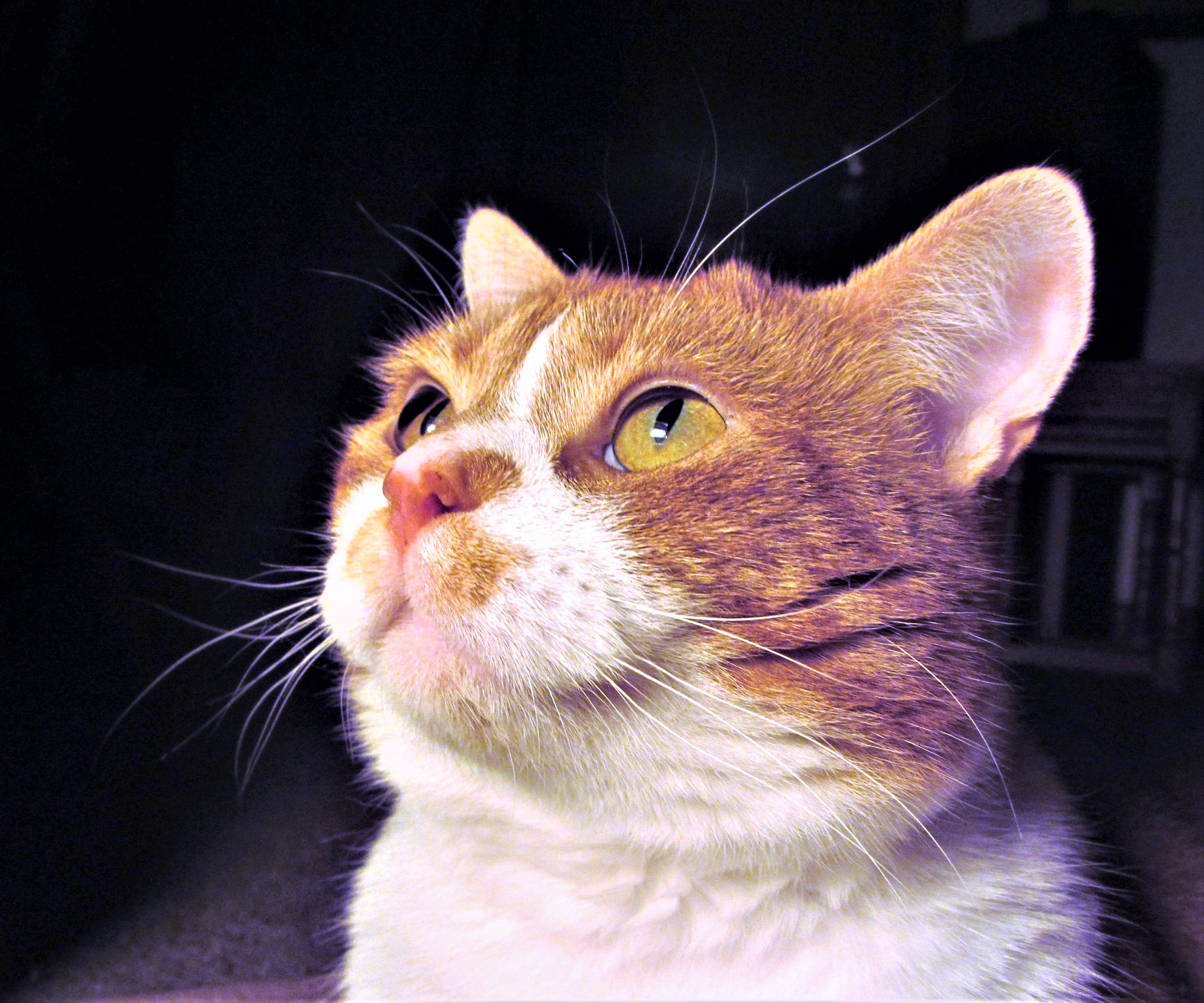
Supraorbital vibrissae and mystacial macrovibrissae of a house cat.

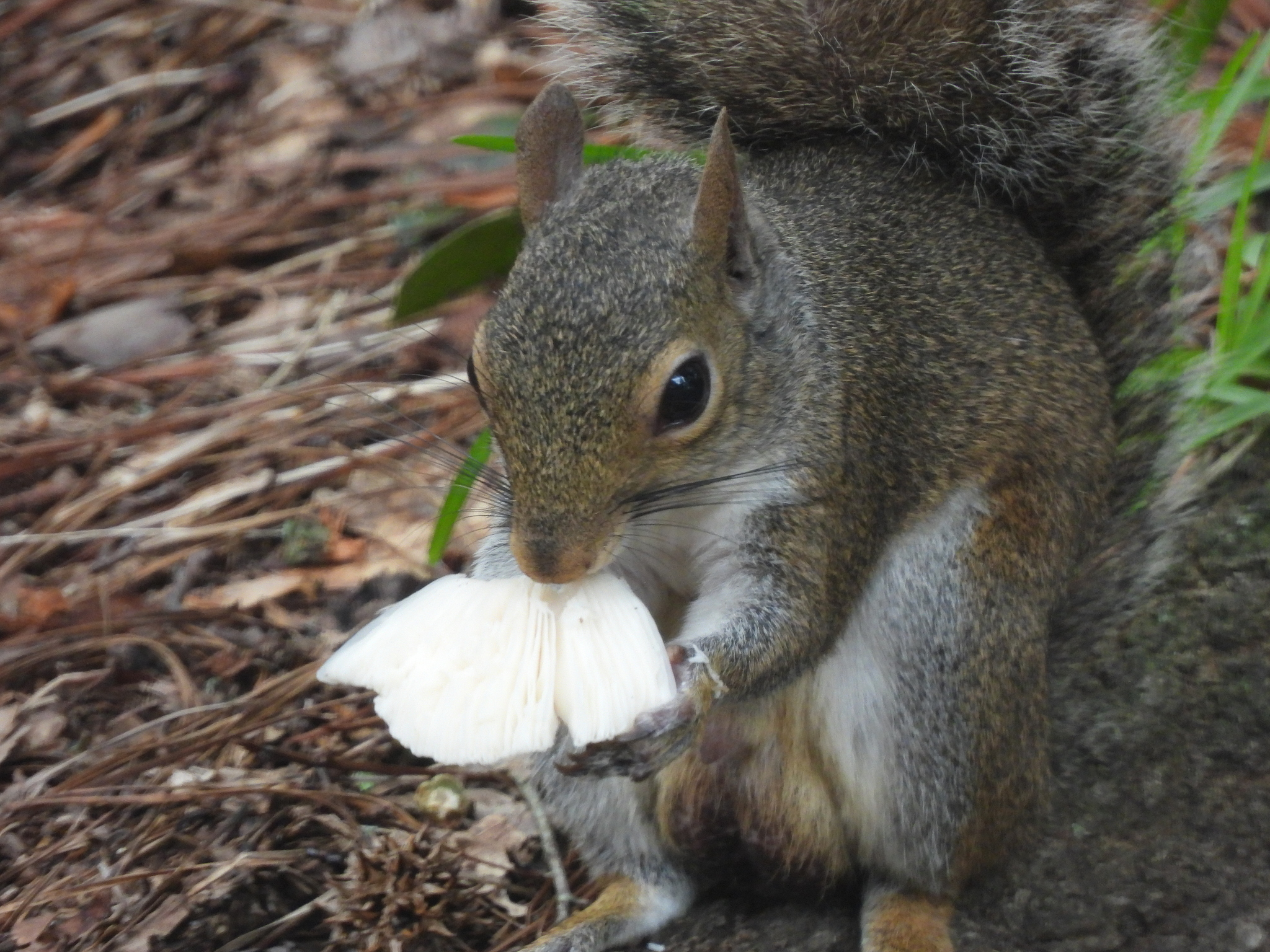
Supraorbital and mystacial macrovibrissae of an eastern gray squirrel.

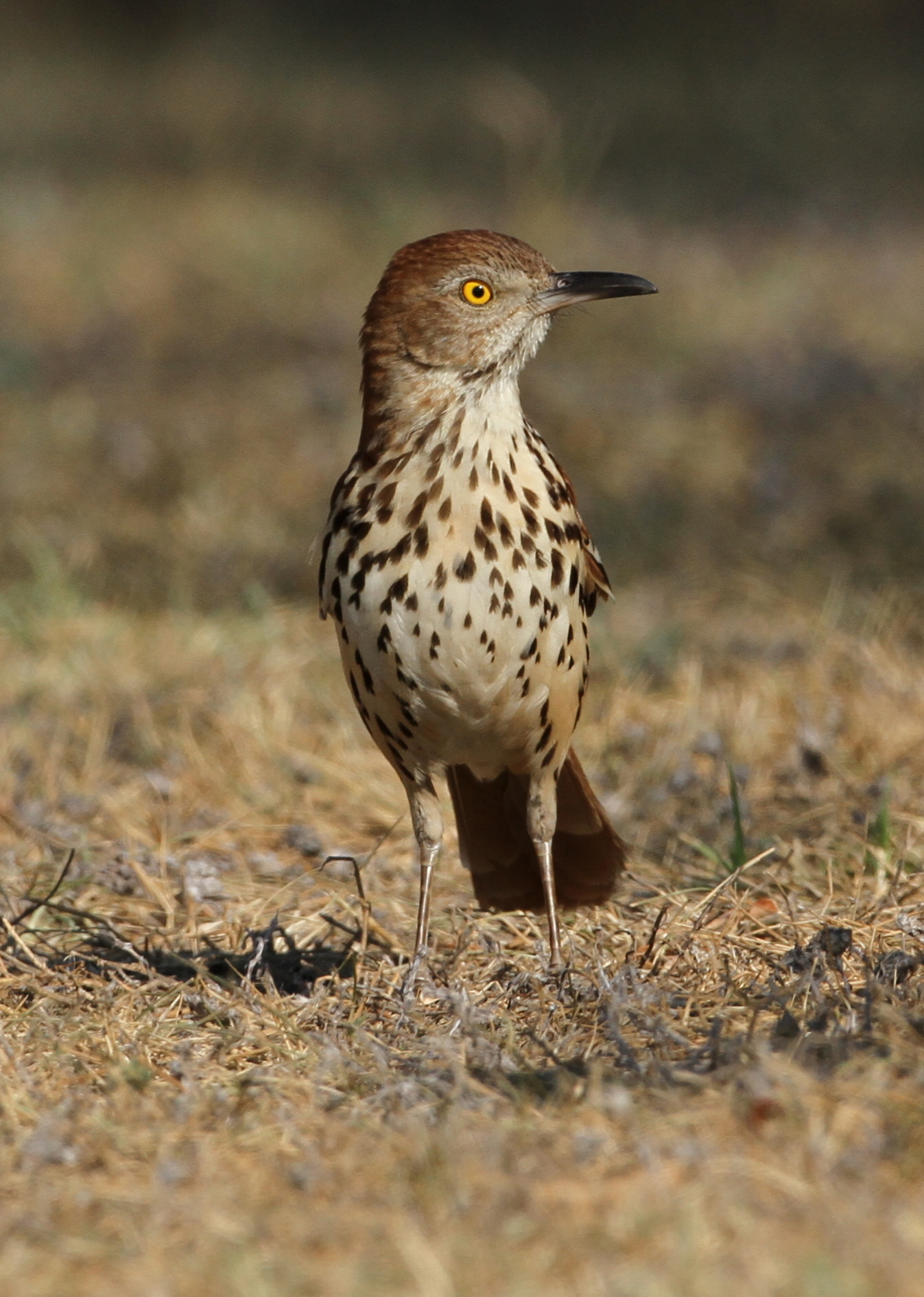
Whiskers of the brown thrasher near the head.
