= Saprospiraceae =

Scientific classification
- Domain: Bacteria
- Kingdom: Pseudomonadati
- Phylum: Bacteroidota
- Class: Saprospiria
- Order: Saprospirales
- Family: Saprospiraceae; Krieg et al. 2012

Genera
- "Candidatus Aquirestis" Hahn and Schauer 2007; Aureispira Hosoya et al. 2006; "Candidatus Epifloribacter" corrig. Xia et al. 2008; Membranicola Li et al. 2016; "Rubidimonas" Yoon et al. 2012; Saprospira Gross 1911 (Approved Lists 1980)

Family of bacteria

The family Saprospiraceae is composed of environmental bacteria. The members of this family are important to the breakdown of complex organic compounds in the environment.
