= Lewinellaceae =

Scientific classification
- Domain: Bacteria
- Kingdom: Pseudomonadati
- Phylum: Bacteroidota
- Class: Saprospiria
- Order: Saprospirales
- Family: Lewinellaceae; Hahnke et al. 2017

Genera
- Flavilitoribacter García-López et al. 2020; Haliscomenobacter van Veen et al. 1973 (Approved Lists 1980); Lewinella Sly et al. 1998; Phaeodactylibacter Chen et al. 2014; Portibacter Yoon et al. 2014

Synonyms
- Haliscomenobacteraceae Hahnke et al. 2017

Class of bacteria

Lewinellaceae is a family of gram-negative bacteria in the phylum Bacteroidota.
