= Saprospirales =

Scientific classification
- Domain: Bacteria
- Kingdom: Pseudomonadati
- Phylum: Bacteroidota
- Class: Saprospiria; Hahnke et al. 2018
- Order: Saprospirales; Hahnke et al. 2017

Families
- Lewinellaceae Hahnke et al. 2017; Saprospiraceae Krieg et al. 2012

Order of bacteria

Saprospirales is an order of gram-negative bacteria in the phylum Bacteroidota.

== See also ==
- List of bacterial orders
