= Nociception =

How an organism receives and responds to painful stimuli

In physiology, nociception /ˌnəʊsɪˈsɛpʃ(ə)n/, also nocioception (from Latin nocere 'to harm/hurt'), is the sensory nervous system's process of encoding noxious stimuli. It deals with a series of events and processes required for an organism to receive a painful stimulus, convert it to a molecular signal, and recognize and characterize the signal to trigger an appropriate defensive response.

In nociception, intense chemical (e.g., capsaicin present in chili pepper or cayenne pepper), mechanical (e.g., cutting, crushing), or thermal (heat and cold) stimulation of sensory neurons called nociceptors produces a signal that travels along a chain of nerve fibers to the brain. Nociception triggers a variety of physiological and behavioral responses to protect the organism against an aggression, and usually results in a subjective experience, or perception, of pain in sentient beings.

== Detection of noxious stimuli ==
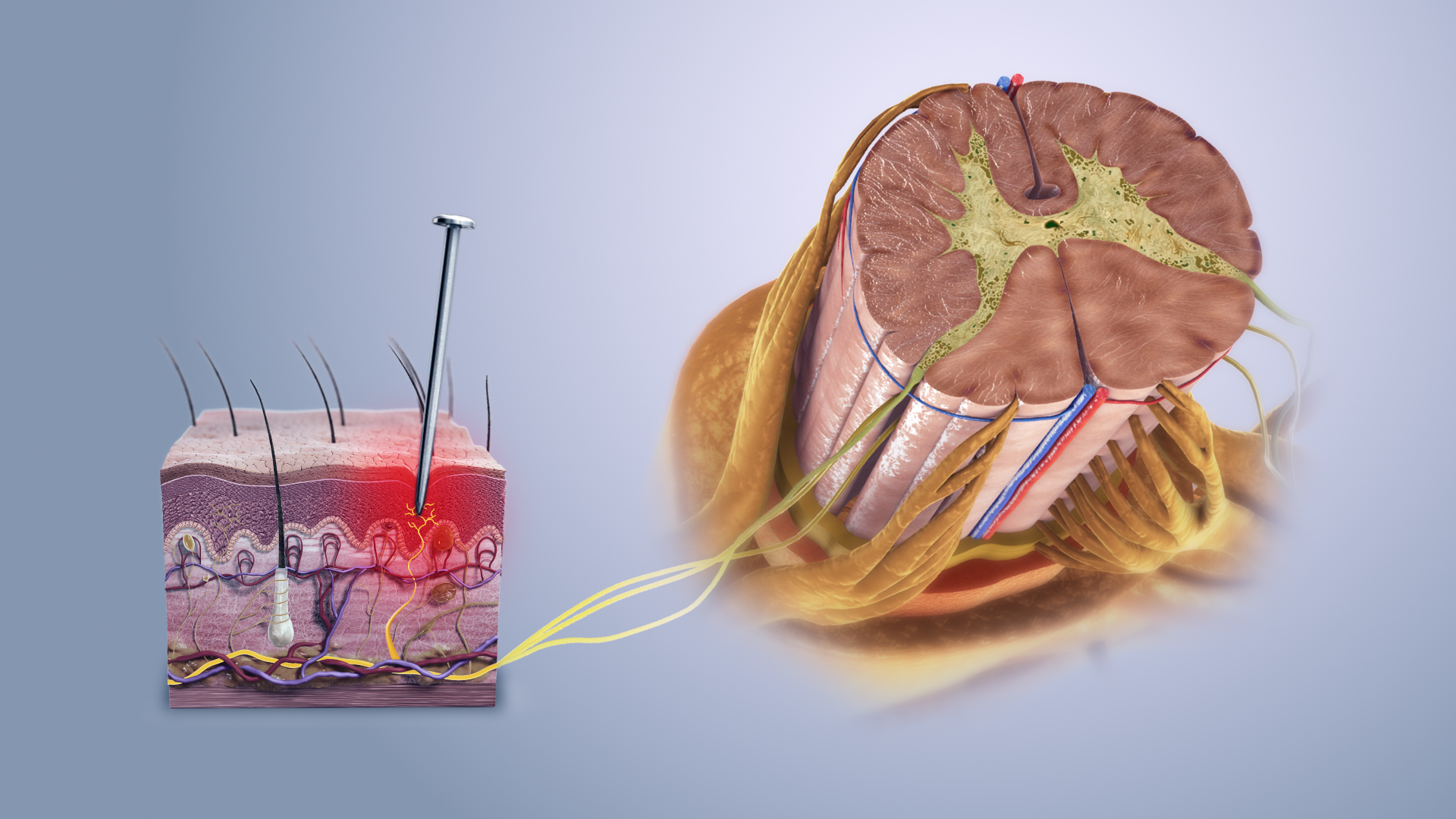
Mechanism of nociception via sensory afferents

Potentially damaging mechanical, thermal, and chemical stimuli are detected by nerve endings called nociceptors, which are found in the skin, on internal surfaces such as the periosteum, joint surfaces, and in some internal organs. Some nociceptors are unspecialized free nerve endings that have their cell bodies outside the spinal column in dorsal root ganglia. Others are specialised structures in the skin such as nociceptive Schwann cells. Nociceptors are categorized according to the axons which travel from the receptors to the spinal cord or brain. After nerve injury, it is possible for touch fibers that normally carry non-noxious stimuli to be perceived as noxious.

Nociceptive pain consists of an adaptive alarm system. Nociceptors have a certain threshold; that is, they require a minimum intensity of stimulation before they trigger a signal. Once this threshold is reached, a signal is passed along the neuron's axon into the spinal cord.

Nociceptive threshold testing deliberately applies a noxious stimulus to a human or animal subject to study pain. In animals, the technique is often used to study the efficacy of analgesic drugs and to establish dosing levels and periods of effect. After establishing a baseline, the drug under test is given, and the elevation in threshold is recorded at specified times. The threshold should return to the baseline (pretreatment) value when the drug wears off. In some conditions, the excitation of pain fibers increases as the pain stimulus continues, leading to a condition called hyperalgesia.

== Consequences ==
Nociception can also cause generalized autonomic responses before or without reaching consciousness to cause pallor, sweating, tachycardia, hypertension, lightheadedness, nausea, and fainting.

== System overview ==
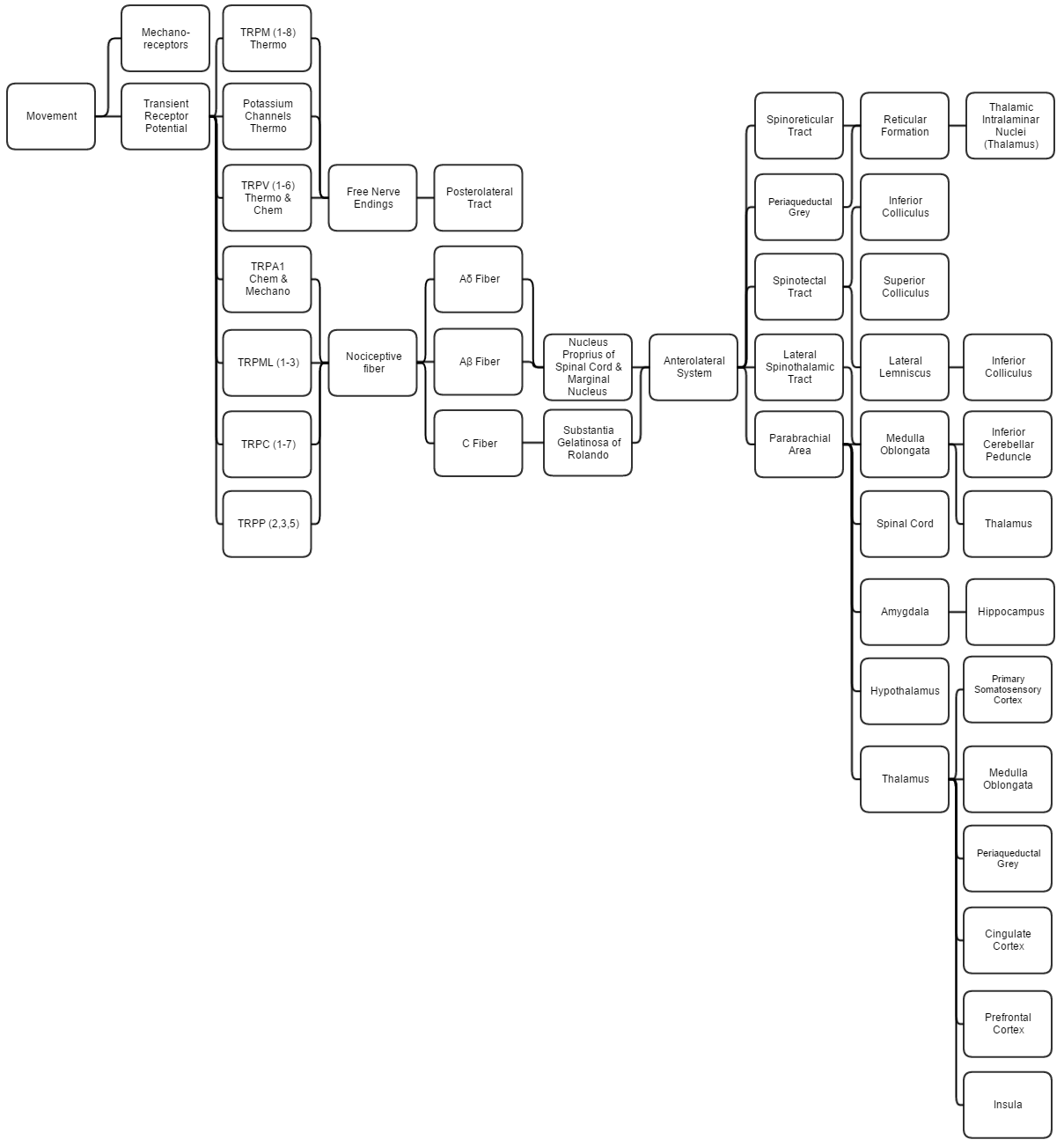
This diagram linearly (unless otherwise mentioned) tracks the projections of all known structures that allow for pain, proprioception, thermoception, and chemoception to their relevant endpoints in the human brain. Click to enlarge.

This overview discusses proprioception, thermoception, chemoception, and nociception, as they are all integrally connected.

=== Mechanical ===
Proprioception is determined by using standard mechanoreceptors (especially ruffini corpuscles (stretch) and transient receptor potential channels (TRP channels). Proprioception is completely covered within the somatosensory system, as the brain processes them together.

Thermoception refers to stimuli of moderate temperatures 24–28 °C (75–82 °F), as anything beyond that range is considered pain and moderated by nociceptors. TRP and potassium channels [TRPM (1-8), TRPV (1-6), TRAAK, and TREK] each respond to different temperatures (among other stimuli), which create action potentials in nerves that join the mechano (touch) system in the posterolateral tract. Thermoception, like proprioception, is then covered by the somatosensory system.

TRP channels that detect noxious stimuli (mechanical, thermal, and chemical pain) relay that information to nociceptors that generate an action potential. Mechanical TRP channels react to depression of their cells (like touch), thermal TRPs change shape in different temperatures, and chemical TRPs act like taste buds, signalling if their receptors bond to certain elements/chemicals.

=== Neural ===
- Laminae 3-5 make up nucleus proprius in spinal grey matter.
- Lamina 2 makes up substantia gelatinosa of Rolando, unmyelinated spinal grey matter. Substantia receives input from nucleus proprius and conveys intense, poorly localized pain.
- Lamina 1 primarily project to the parabrachial area and periaqueductal grey, which begins the suppression of pain via neural and hormonal inhibition. Lamina 1 receive input from thermoreceptors via the posterolateral tract. Marginal nucleus of the spinal cord are the only unsuppressible pain signals.
- The parabrachial area integrates taste and pain info, then relays it. Parabrachial checks if the pain is being received in normal temperatures and if the gustatory system is active; if both are so the pain is assumed to be due to poison.
- Ao fibers synapse on laminae 1 and 5 while Ab synapses on 1, 3, 5, and C. C fibers exclusively synapse on lamina 2.
- The amygdala and hippocampus create and encode the memory and emotion due to pain stimuli.
- The hypothalamus signals for the release of hormones that make pain suppression more effective; some of these are sex hormones.
- Periaqueductal grey (with hypothalamic hormone aid) hormonally signals reticular formation's raphe nuclei to produce serotonin that inhibits laminae pain nuclei.
- Lateral spinothalamic tract aids in localization of pain.
- Spinoreticular and spinotectal tracts are merely relay tracts to the thalamus that aid in the perception of pain and alertness towards it. Fibers cross over (left becomes right) via the spinal anterior white commissure.
- Lateral lemniscus is the first point of integration of sound and pain information.
- Inferior colliculus (IC) aids in sound orienting to pain stimuli.
- Superior colliculus receives IC's input, integrates visual orienting info, and uses the balance topographical map to orient the body to the pain stimuli.
- Inferior cerebellar peduncle integrates proprioceptive info and outputs to the vestibulocerebellum. The peduncle is not part of the lateral-spinothalamic-tract-pathway; the medulla receives the info and passes it onto the peduncle from elsewhere (see somatosensory system).
- The thalamus is where pain is thought to be brought into perception; it also aids in pain suppression and modulation, acting like a bouncer, allowing certain intensities through to the cerebrum and rejecting others.
- The somatosensory cortex decodes nociceptor info to determine the exact location of pain and is where proprioception is brought into consciousness; inferior cerebellar peduncle is all unconscious proprioception.
- Insula judges the intensity of the pain and provides the ability to imagine pain.
- Cingulate cortex is presumed to be the memory hub for pain.

== In non-mammals ==
Nociception has been documented in other animals, including fish and a wide range of invertebrates, including leeches, nematode worms, sea slugs, and fruit flies. As in mammals, nociceptive neurons in these species are typically characterized by responding preferentially to high temperature (40 °C (104 °F) or more), low pH, capsaicin, and tissue damage.

== History of term ==
The term "nociception" was coined by Charles Scott Sherrington to distinguish the physiological process (nervous activity) from pain (a subjective experience). It is derived from the Latin verb nocēre, which means "to harm".

== See also ==
- Electroreception – Biological electricity-related abilities
- Mechanoreceptor – Sensory receptor cell responding to mechanical pressure or strain
- Thermoception – Sensation and perception of temperature
- Proprioception – Sense of self-movement, force, and body position
