= Edward Perl =

American neuroscientist

Edward R. Perl
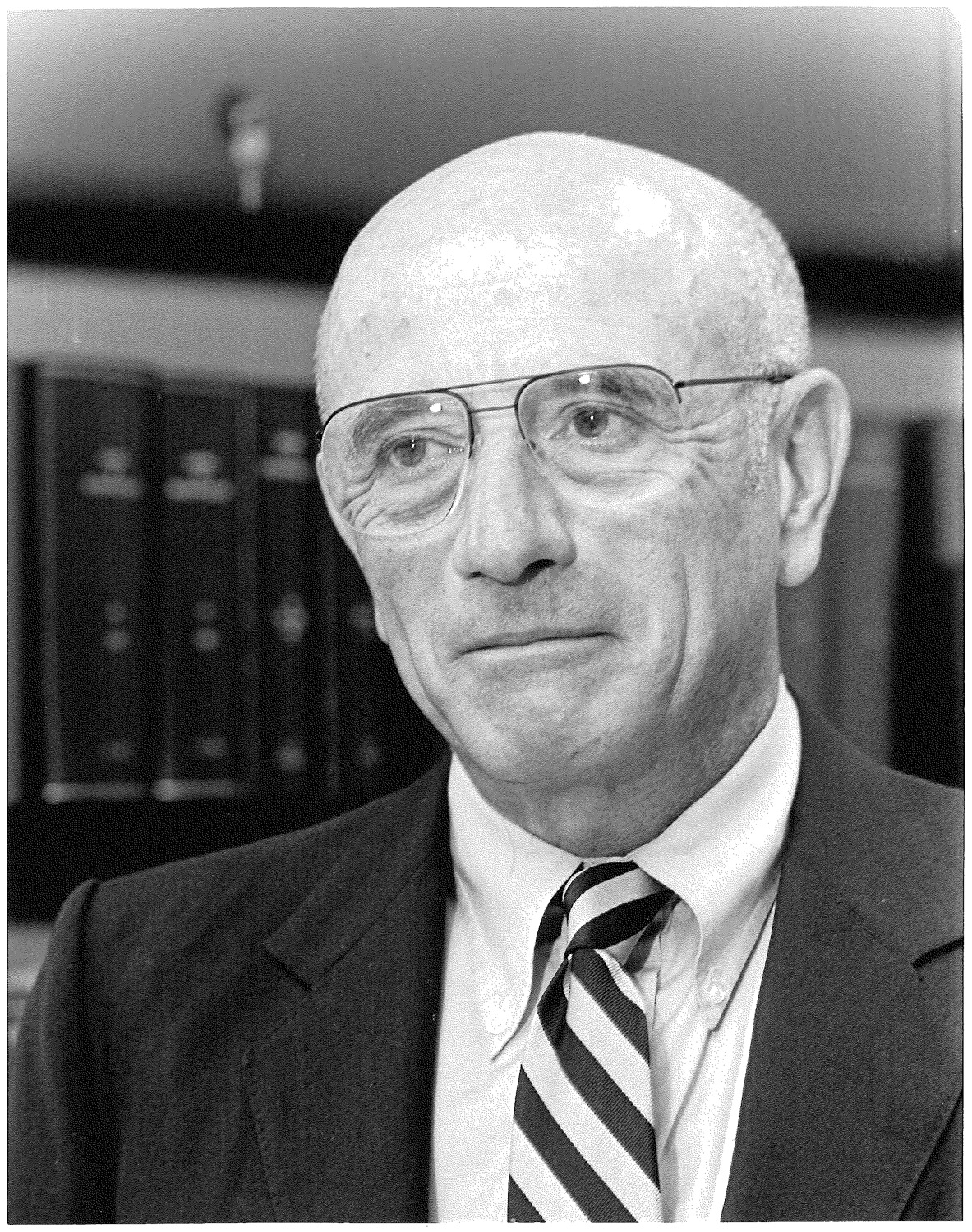
- Born: October 6, 1926; Chicago, Illinois
- Died: July 15, 2014; Durham, North Carolina
- Education: University of Chicago
- Known for: Pain research
- Awards: Bristol-Meyers Squibb Award for Distinguished Research on Pain (1991); Gerard Prize for Outstanding Contributions to Neuroscience (1998)
- Scientific career
- Fields: Neuroscience
- Workplaces: University of Chicago; Harvard University; Johns Hopkins University; State University of New York Upstate Medical University; University of Utah; University of North Carolina

Edward Roy Perl (October 6, 1926 – July 15, 2014) was an American neuroscientist whose research focused on neural mechanisms of and circuitry involved in somatic sensation, principally nociception. Work in his laboratory in the late 1960s established the existence of unique nociceptors. Perl was one of the founding members of the Society for Neuroscience and served as its first president. He was a Sarah Graham Kenan Professor of Cell Biology & Physiology and a member of the UNC Neuroscience Center at the University of North Carolina School of Medicine.

== Early life and military training ==
Perl was born in Chicago, Illinois to John and Blanche Perl, natives of Hungary and Czechoslovakia, respectively. As a child, Perl was fascinated by electricity, which led to an interest in electronics, radio, and the sciences. In college at the University of Chicago, Perl focused on physics and engineering, but a conversation with his father, who was a physician and surgeon, convinced him to pursue a career in medicine as a means of studying human physiology.

While in college, Perl was accepted into the U.S. Navy's Officer Training Program. He served as a medical trainee at the V-12 Navy College Training Program at the Great Lakes Naval Station (Chicago) in the summer of 1945 and began studies at the University of Illinois School of Medicine (Chicago) in the fall of 1945, at which time he was discharged into the naval reserves with the end of WWII. Perl earned his Bachelor of Science degree in 1947 and his M.D. in 1949.

== Early research career ==
Perl's first exposure to neuroscience came at the University of Illinois School of Medicine's Illinois Neuropsychiatric Institute (Chicago), where he worked for a time as a part-time graduate student in Warren S. McCulloch's laboratory and where he met, among other notables of the time, Elwood Henneman, whose experiments on spinal reflexes and supraspinal control of motor function were to influence Perl's later research path. A project undertaken in the laboratory of cardiac physiologist William V. Whitehorn in the late 1940s led to Perl's first scientific paper, published in Science in 1949. The principles behind the device Perl designed for this project became the foundation for impedance cardiography. This work earned Perl a master's degree in 1951.

In the summer of 1948 Perl had served as a clerk on the Harvard Medical Service of Boston City Hospital, where his interactions with neurologist and neuroscience researcher Derek Denny-Brown steered Perl toward a career in neurophysiology. Perl began a postdoctoral fellowship in the laboratory of Philip Bard in the Department of Physiology at Johns Hopkins University in the fall of 1950; there he met neuroanatomist Jerzy Rose and neurophysiologist Vernon Mountcastle, who would become a lifelong mentor in surgical and electrophysiological recording techniques. During this time Perl became interested in how the activity of C-fiber afferent neurons was transferred to the cerebral cortex, a project that proved difficult, but which influenced his interest in these unmyelinated afferent fibers and their then-presumed participation in the detection and transmission of pain and temperature sensations to the brain.

Perl was called to active duty as a naval physician in January, 1952, and served as a medical officer at the Walter Reed Army Institute of Research, where he joined a neuroscience research group led by David McKenzie Rioch and staffed by Robert Galambos, Michael Fuortes, Walle Nauta, and David Whitlock.

== First faculty positions ==
In 1954 Perl accepted a faculty position at the State University of New York, College of Medicine, Syracuse (now known as SUNY Upstate Medical University), where he not only researched crossed spinal reflexes, but also renewed his interest in the activity of C-fiber afferent fibers and their projections to the spinal cord.

Perl left SUNY-Syracuse in 1957 to join the University of Utah's Department of Physiology, then led by neurophysiologist Carlton C. Hunt. Perl's work at Utah focused on spinothalamic somatosensory pathways and the interactions between primary afferent neurons and spinal dorsal column nuclei.

Beginning in 1962, Perl spent a year in Yves Laporte's laboratory at the Faculté de Médecine in Toulouse, France. His time in Europe enabled him to meet with and observe French neurophysiologists Paul Bessou, Albert Fessard, Denise Albe-Fessard, Pierre Buser, Jean-Marie Besson, and Hungarian neuroanatomists János (John) Szentágothai and Miklós Réthelyi. A visit with neurophysiologist Ainsley Iggo at the University of Edinburgh proved vital in allowing Perl expertise in recording the electrical activity of C-fibers. He would repeat trips to France over the coming decades in order to engage in collaborative research with European colleagues.

== Documentation of nociceptors ==
Perl's return to the University of Utah in 1963 marked the beginning of a research interest in primary afferent neurons, which evolved into a focus on nociceptors. Paul Bessou visited Perl's laboratory and the two documented the activities of mechanoreceptive primary afferent neurons, whose thinly myelinated afferent fibers were responsive to non-noxious mechanical stimulation. Pioneering experiments in cats with then-graduate student Paul Richards Burgess demonstrated the existence of a class of thinly myelinated primary-afferent fibers that only responded to noxious (nociceptive) mechanical stimulation; Burgess and Perl (1967) described in depth this class of high-threshold mechanoreceptor, using nociceptor, a term coined by Charles Sherrington in 1906, to identify these neurons. The work by Burgess and Perl represents the first thorough documentation of a large sample of nociceptors, primary afferent neurons that detect stimuli capable of causing tissue injury and transmit information about these insults centrally. (Previous work by Ainsley Iggo had provided a small sample of primary afferent fibers that are now understood to have been C-polymodal nociceptors.)

Perl extended these studies to primate, showing the existence of high-threshold mechanoreceptors in squirrel monkey. Further experiments with Bessou not only revealed the complexity of myelinated and unmyelinated nociceptors, but also thoroughly documented the existence and properties of C-polymodal nociceptors, which respond to a variety of noxious stimuli. Later experiments with Lawrence Kruger and Mathius "Skip" J. Sedivec in Perl's laboratory in the late 1970s (after Perl had moved to the University of North Carolina) examined the fine structure of peripheral endings of cutaneous high-threshold mechanoreceptors (nociceptors) in cats. In parallel with this work at the University of North Carolina, Perl and co-workers sought to correlate how stimulating individual cutaneous nociceptors in awake human volunteers is experienced by these subjects; the resulting study proved the linkage between activation of identified nociceptors and the subjective experience of pain in humans.

== Central projections of nociceptors and nociceptive spinal circuitry ==
While still at the University of Utah, Perl and Burgess Christensen, then a post-doctoral fellow, determined that the marginal zone (lamina I) of the dorsal horn of the spinal cord contained neurons that were responsive to different kinds of noxious and innocuous stimuli from the periphery. Experiments with Takao Kumazawa in the late 1960s into the mid-1970s confirmed in monkey observations about unmyelinated primary afferent fibers and their central projections that had earlier been seen in cats. These studies made clear that areas of the superficial dorsal horn served as integration sites for nociceptive and non-nociceptive information received from the periphery.

Perl continued this work after he left the University of Utah to become chair of the Department of Physiology at the University of North Carolina in 1971. In the mid-1970s Alan R. Light, Miklós Réthelyi, and Daniel Trevino joined Perl's laboratory to further map the central terminations of thinly-myelinated primary afferent neurons, to study their synaptic morphologies, and to characterize neurons in the dorsal horn of the spinal cord that were responsive to activity of these fibers. In a methodological tour de force, Perl worked with Yasuo Sugiura and Chong Lee in the mid-1980s to physiologically characterize and label (with Phaseolus vulgaris leucoagglutinin) unmyelinated C-fibers. These studies revealed for the first time a functional organization to the central termination pattern of unmyelinated afferents with different response profiles to skin stimulation. Experiments performed by Christopher Honda, Siegfried Mense, and Perl in the early 1980s demonstrated that neurons located in specific areas of the cat thalamus were responsive to noxious stimulation of the skin of the hindlimb. As a whole, studies in the Perl laboratory in the 1970s and 1980s helped clarify a specific pattern of somatosensory (principally nociceptive) input to the spinal cord and brain and established the foundation for a circuitry devoted to the processing of noxious stimuli from the periphery.

The last decades of work in the Perl laboratory were principally devoted to characterizing the functional organization of the superficial dorsal horn of the spinal cord and understanding how spinal neurons located within these regions interact with one another to process signals arising from the periphery. These experiments involved recording from neurons responsive to various types of primary afferent input and correlating these functional signatures with morphological features of the spinal neurons in question. This work in part resulted in the systematic categorization by Timothy Grudt and Perl of functionally characterized spinal neurons based on their morphological features and location within the dorsal horn. Experiments with Yan Lu and Jihong Zheng were aimed at a better understanding of connections between spinal neurons and how afferent input from the periphery is modulated by these connections. Perl's experiments with Adam Hantman focused on a unique, homogeneous population of Green fluorescent protein (GFP)-expressing neurons in the spinal substantia gelatinosa of a transgenic mouse. Hantman and Perl physiologically characterized these neurons, showing them to be inhibitory in nature and responsive only to unmyelinated afferents with a conduction velocity at the high end of the C-fiber range; they also demonstrated the highly specific connections of these GFP-expressing neurons with other types of neurons in the substantia gelatinosa.

== Founding of the Society for Neuroscience ==
At the suggestion of neurophysiologist Ralph W. Gerard, whose idea it was to establish a Society for Neuroscience, Perl chaired a committee of fellow neuroscientists in 1969, the aim of which was to lay the groundwork for the function of the nascent society. As a founding member, Perl was elected president, but chose to take the title of acting president (1969–1970) until a president could be elected democratically by a representative membership. He felt that it was important for the society to attract young investigators who are active in the laboratory.

== Awards and honors ==
Among other recognitions for his contributions to neuroscience, Perl was awarded the Bristol-Myers Squibb Award for Distinguished Research on Pain in 1991 and the Ralph W. Gerard Prize in Neuroscience in 1998. He was elected a Fellow in the American Academy of Arts and Sciences in 1992.

== Establishment of the Perl-UNC Prize ==
In 2000 Perl endowed a national prize to be given annually to investigators who have made significant contributions to neuroscience through outstanding discoveries or seminal insights. In establishing the Perl-UNC Neuroscience Prize, Perl noted that “the prize allows me to acknowledge the University of North Carolina for the opportunities it has given me” and, further, that it would be a tribute to the strength of the neuroscience research program at the university. As of 2014, six recipients of the Perl-UNC Prize have gone on to win Nobel Prizes in either Physiology/Medicine (Linda Buck, Richard Axel, May-Britt Moser, Edvard Moser) or Chemistry (Roger Tsien, Roderick MacKinnon).
