= Reticular nucleus =

Reticular nucleus may refer to:

- Caudal pontine reticular nucleus
- Gigantocellular reticular nucleus, a nucleus that innervates the caudal hypoglossal nucleus, and responds to glutamatergic stimuli.
- Lateral reticular nucleus
- Oral pontine reticular nucleus
- Paramedian reticular nucleus, a nucleus that mediate the horizontal eye movements on their ipsilateral sides
- Parvocellular reticular nucleus, part of the brain located dorsolateral to the caudal pontine reticular nucleus
- Reticulotegmental nucleus, an area within the floor of the midbrain
- Thalamic reticular nucleus, part of the ventral thalamus that forms a capsule around the thalamus laterally
- Ventral reticular nucleus, a continuation of the parvocellular nucleus in the brainstem
