= Raphespinal tract =

Details

Identifiers
- Latin: tractus raphespinales

The raphespinal tract is a descending spinal cord tract located in the medulla oblongata. It consists of two tracts an anterior raphespinal tract, and a lateral raphespinal tract that mainly descend in the lateral funiculus. Fibers descend in the ventral portion of the lateral funiculus, mainly bilaterally to terminate in laminae I, II, and IV.

The tract emerges from three of the raphe nuclei, the magnus, obscurus, and pallidus. The fibers of the raphespinal tract are mainly serotonergic. When raphe nuclei are stimulated they release serotonin which modulates the transmission of pain.

== Pathways ==
Pain pathways converging upon the raphe nuclei to modulate pain via the raphespinal tract include:

  - Laminae I and V of spinal cord→ spinomesencephalic tract → periaqueductal gray → nucleus raphe magnus →
  - Laminae I and V of spinal cord → spinomesencephalic tract → mesencephalon raphe nuclei →
  - Nociceptive group C first-order nerve fiber → interneurons of lamina II (substantia gelatinosa) and lamina III of the posterior grey column of the spinal cord → second-order neurons of laminae V-VIII of spinal cord → spinoreticular tract → nucleus raphe magnus and gigantocellular raphe nucleus →
- Raphespinal tract → spinal trigeminal nucleus and posterior grey column of the spinal cord → activating serotonergic synapses with inhibitory enkephalinergic interneurons → inhibitory enkephalinergic synapses with nociceptive first-order nerve fibers.

== Function ==
Electrical stimulation of either the periaqueductal gray or (its downstream target) nucleus raphe magnus induces profund analgesia; this effect can be abolished both by transection of the raphespinal tract as well as by opioid receptor antagonists (evidencing one of the mechanisms by which opioid bring about pain relief). An electrical stimulator implant of the periaqueductal gray can be used clinically for pain management, evoking instantaneous pain relief upon activation.

The raphespinal tract appears to also be involved in modulating motor activity as serotonin increases the excitability of motor neurons - serotonin-blocking medications can alleviate spasticity caused by damage to the motor pathways.

== See also ==
- Dorsolateral pontine reticular formation
