= Spinoreticular tract =

Details

Identifiers
- Latin: tractus spinoreticularis
- TA98: A14.1.02.231
- TA2: 6105
- FMA: 75693

The spinoreticular tract (also paleospinothalamic pathway, or indirect pathway of the anterolateral system) is a partially decussating (crossed-over) four-neuron sensory pathway of the central nervous system. The tract transmits slow nociceptive/pain information (but thermal, and crude touch information as well) from the spinal cord to reticular formation which in turn relays the information to the thalamus via reticulothalamic fibers as well as to other parts of the brain (as opposed to the spinothalamic tract - the direct pathway of the anterolateral system - which projects from the spinal cord to the thalamus directly without such "layovers"). Most (85%) second-order axons arising from sensory C first-order fibers ascend in the spinoreticular tract - it is consequently responsible for transmitting "slow", dull, poorly-localised pain. By projecting to the reticular activating system (RAS), the tract also mediates arousal/alertness (including wakefulness) in response to noxious (harmful) stimuli. The tract is phylogenetically older than the spinothalamic ("neospinothalamic") tract.

== Anatomy ==
=== Origin ===
Axons of sensory group C nerve fibers first synapse with interneurons in the substantia gelatinosa of Rolando (lamina II), and lamina III of the posterior grey column of the spinal cord. These interneurons then synapse with second-order neurons in laminae V-VIII Their axons then ascend in the spinal cord near the lateral spinothalamic tract.

A minority of second-order axons of the spinoreticular tract bypass the reticular formation, and project directly to the intralaminar thalamic nuclei.

=== Pathway ===
The tract is bilateral: its fibers ascend predominately ipsilaterally, but a minority decussate in the anterior white commissure to ascend contralaterally. Second-order axons of this tract terminate by forming multiple synapses in the nuclei of the medullary, pontine, and mesencephalic reticular formation. The nuclei of the reticular formation lack somatotopic organisation (consequently, sensory stimuli conveyed via this pathway are indistinctly localised).

The reticular formation in turn conveys the tract to:

- (bilaterally via reticulothalamic fibers) thalamus - in turn projects to the cerebral cortex to mediate the conscious perception of noxious stimuli.
  - via central tegmental tract → intralaminar nuclei of thalamus (these are considered a rostral, thalamic extension of the reticular formation) → primary somatosensory cortex
  - medial dorsal nucleus of thalamus
- nucleus raphe magnus and gigantocellular raphe nucleus → raphespinal tract → spinal trigeminal nucleus and posterior grey column of the spinal cord - the fibers of the tract terminate by forming excitatory serotonergic synapses with inhibitory enkephalinergic interneurons which in turn form inhibitory synapses with nociceptive first-order neurons to pre-synaptically inhibit nociception.
- via central tegmental tract → hypothalamus - mediates reflex autonomic and endocrine response to pain.
- limbic system - mediates affective/emotional responses to pain.
