= Dorsolateral pontine reticular formation =

The dorsolateral pontine reticular formation contains noradrenergic pain-inhibiting neurons which project to inhibitory interneurons of the substantia gelatinosa of the posterior grey column in the spinal cord. It thus complements the classical serotonergic-opioid peptide descending pain-inhibiting system: whereas the serotonergic-opioid peptide pathway ultimately pre-synaptically inhibits first-order nociceptive group C neurons, the DLPRF inhibits - by way of presumably GABAergic inhibitory interneurons - the second-order neurons of the ascending pain pathway. The DLPRF pathway is not affected by opioid agonists or antagonists.

It is also involved in REM sleep.

== See also ==
- Raphespinal tract - the canonical descending pain-inhibiting pathway which the DLPRF functionally complements.
- Reticular formation
