= Spinomesencephalic pathway =

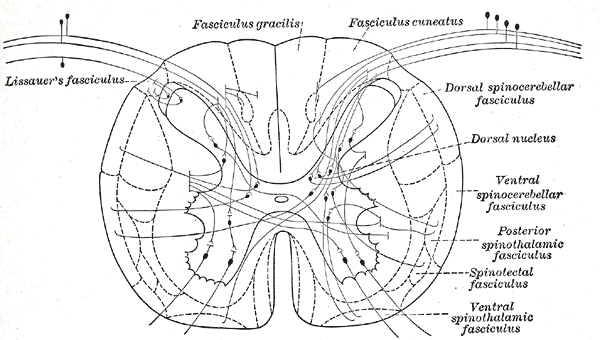
- Diagram showing a few of the connections of afferent (sensory) fibers of the posterior root with the efferent fibers from the ventral column and with the various long ascending fasciculi. (Spinotectal fasciculus labeled at bottom right.)

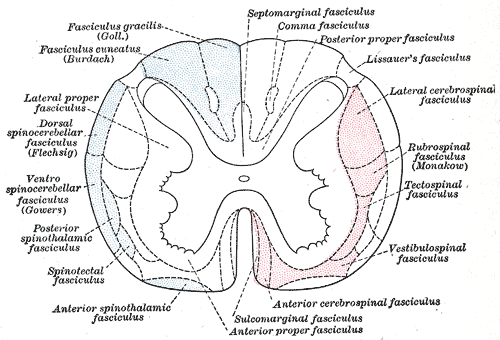
- Diagram of the principal fasciculi of the spinal cord. (Spinotectal fasciculus labeled at bottom left.)

The spinomesencephalic pathway, spinomesencephalic tract or spino-quadrigeminal system of Mott, includes a number of ascending tracts in the spinal cord, including the spinotectal tract. The spinomesencephalic tract is one of the ascending tracts in the anterolateral system of the spinal cord that projects to various parts of the midbrain. It is involved in the processing of pain and visceral sensations.

== In the ALS ==
The anterolateral system (ALS) is a bundle of afferent somatosensory fibers from different ascending tracts in the spinal cord. These fibers include those of the spinomesencephalic tract, spinothalamic tract, and spinoreticular tract amongst others. Spinomesencephalic fibres project to the periaqueductal gray, and to the tectum. Other fibers project to and terminate in the parabrachial nucleus, the pretectum, and the nucleus of Darkschewitsch. The fibers that project to the tectum are known as the spinotectal fibers. The spinotectal tract fibers project to the superior colliculus. Where they synapse onto cells of the deeper superior colliculus they are activated by noxious stimuli.

=== Anatomy ===
The spinomesencephalic tract consists mostly of myelinated fibers. The neurons are either low-threshold of a wide dynamic range, or high threshold, with many of the cells being nociceptive.

=== Origin ===
Cells of the spinomesencephalic tract arise mostly in Rexed lamina I, and to a lesser extent in Rexed laminae IV and VI-VIII) of the spinal cord. They are mostly concentrated in lamina V. The tract is in the same region as the spinothalamic tract.

=== Course ===
Most of the spinomesencephalic fibers decussate to ascend contralaterally, but there is a noted group of uncrossed fibers in the upper cervical levels.

== See also ==
- Tectospinal tract
- Raphespinal tract
