= Root of spinal nerve =

Root of spinal nerve may refer to:

- Dorsal root of spinal nerve
- Ventral root of spinal nerve
