= Ventral reticular nucleus =

Details

Identifiers
- Latin: nucleus reticularis ventralis
- NeuroNames: 733

The ventral reticular nucleus is a continuation of the parvocellular nucleus in the brainstem.

The ventral reticular nucleus has been shown to receive afferent projections from the dentate gyrus in rabbits.

The rostral portion of the ventral reticular nucleus has been shown to mediate inspiration along with a portion of the lateral reticular nucleus.
