= Labial commissures =

Labial commissures may refer to:

- Anterior commissure of labia majora (commissura labiorum anterior)
- Posterior commissure of labia majora (commissura labiorum posterior)
- Labial commissure of mouth (commissura labiorum oris)
