= Reticular formation =

Spinal trigeminal nucleus

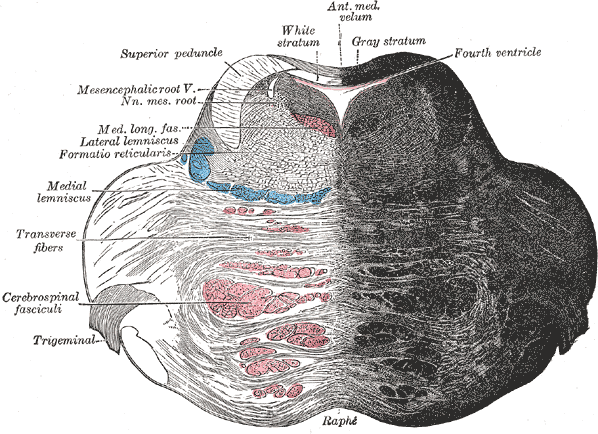
- Coronal section of the pons, at its upper part. (Formatio reticularis labeled at left.)

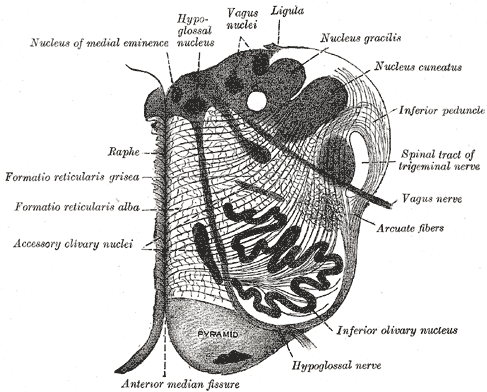
- Traverse section of the medulla oblongata at about the middle of the olive. (Formatio reticularis grisea and formatio reticularis alba labeled at left.)

Details
- Location: Brainstem, hypothalamus and other regions

Identifiers
- Latin: formatio reticularis
- MeSH: D012154
- NeuroNames: 1223
- NeuroLex ID: nlx_143558
- TA98: A14.1.00.021; A14.1.05.403; A14.1.06.327
- TA2: 5367
- FMA: 77719

The reticular formation is a set of interconnected nuclei in the brainstem that spans from the lower end of the medulla oblongata to the upper end of the midbrain. The neurons of the reticular formation make up a complex set of neural networks in the core of the brainstem. The reticular formation is made up of a diffuse net-like formation of reticular nuclei which is not well-defined. It may be seen as being made up of all the interspersed cells in the brainstem between the more compact and named structures.

The reticular formation is functionally divided into the ascending reticular activating system (ARAS), ascending pathways to the cerebral cortex, and the descending reticular system, descending pathways (reticulospinal tracts) to the spinal cord. Due to its extent along the brainstem it may be divided into different areas such as the midbrain reticular formation, the central mesencephalic reticular formation, the pontine reticular formation, the paramedian pontine reticular formation, the dorsolateral pontine reticular formation, and the medullary reticular formation.

Neurons of the ARAS basically act as an on/off switch to the cerebral cortex and hence play a crucial role in regulating wakefulness; behavioral arousal and consciousness are functionally related in the reticular formation using a number of neurotransmitter arousal systems. The overall functions of the reticular formation are modulatory and premotor, (Note: premotor function as in integrating feedback sensory signals with commands from upper motor neurons and deep cerebellar nuclei, and organizing the efferent activities of lower visceral motor and some somatic motor neurons in the brainstem and spinal cord.) involving somatic motor control, cardiovascular control, pain modulation, sleep and consciousness, and habituation. The modulatory functions are primarily found in the rostral sector of the reticular formation and the premotor functions are localized in the neurons in more caudal regions.

The reticular formation is divided into three columns: raphe nuclei (median), gigantocellular reticular nuclei (medial zone), and parvocellular reticular nuclei (lateral zone). The raphe nuclei are the place of synthesis of the neurotransmitter serotonin, which plays an important role in mood regulation. The gigantocellular nuclei are involved in motor coordination. The parvocellular nuclei regulate exhalation.

The reticular formation is essential for governing some of the basic functions of higher organisms. It is phylogenetically old and found in lower vertebrates.

== Structure ==
A cross section of the lower part of the pons showing the pontine reticular formation labeled as #9

The human reticular formation is composed of almost 100 nuclei and contains many projections into the forebrain, brainstem, and cerebellum, among other regions. It includes the reticular nuclei, reticulothalamic projection fibers, diffuse thalamocortical projections, ascending cholinergic projections, descending non-cholinergic projections, and descending reticulospinal projections. The reticular formation also contains two major neural subsystems, the ascending reticular activating system and descending reticulospinal tracts, which mediate distinct cognitive and physiological processes. It has been functionally cleaved both sagittally and coronally.

Traditionally the reticular nuclei are divided into three columns:

- In the median column – the raphe nuclei
- In the medial column – gigantocellular nuclei (because of larger size of the cells)
- In the lateral column – parvocellular nuclei (because of smaller size of the cells)

The original functional differentiation was a division of caudal and rostral. This was based upon the observation that the lesioning of the rostral reticular formation induces a hypersomnia in the cat brain, while lesioning the caudal portion causes insomnia. This study has led to the idea that the caudal portion inhibits the rostral portion of the reticular formation.

Sagittal division reveals more morphological distinctions. The raphe nuclei form a ridge in the middle of the reticular formation, and, directly to its periphery, there is a division called the medial reticular formation. The medial RF is large and has long ascending and descending fibers, and is surrounded by the lateral reticular formation. The lateral RF is close to the motor nuclei of the cranial nerves, and mostly mediates their function.

=== Medial and lateral reticular formation ===
The medial reticular formation and lateral reticular formation are two columns of nuclei with ill-defined boundaries that send projections through the medulla and into the midbrain. The nuclei can be differentiated by function, cell type, and projections of efferent or afferent nerves. Moving caudally from the rostral midbrain, at the site of the rostral pons and the midbrain, the medial RF becomes less prominent, and the lateral RF becomes more prominent.

Existing on the sides of the medial reticular formation is its lateral cousin, which is particularly pronounced in the rostral medulla and caudal pons. Out from this area spring the cranial nerves, including the very important vagus nerve. The lateral RF is known for its ganglions and areas of interneurons around the cranial nerves, which serve to mediate their characteristic reflexes and functions.

== Major subsystems ==
The subsystems of the reticular formation are the ascending reticular activating system, and the descending reticular system.

=== Ascending reticular activating system ===
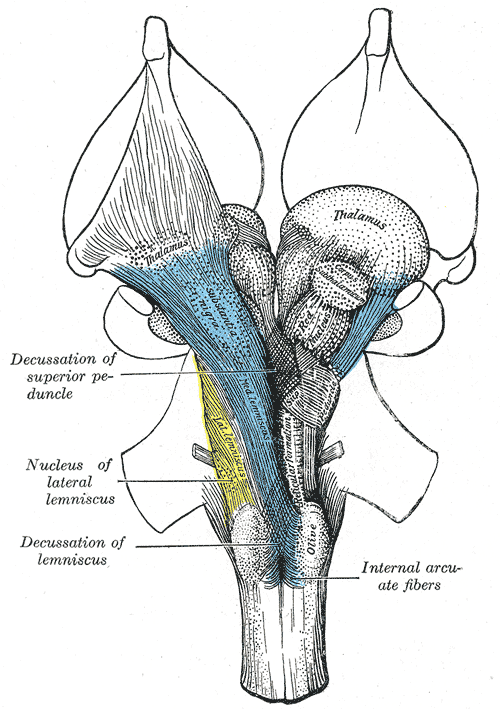
Ascending reticular activating system. Reticular formation labeled near center.

The ascending reticular activating system (ARAS), also known as the extrathalamic control modulatory system or simply the reticular activating system (RAS), is a set of connected nuclei in the brains of vertebrates that is responsible for regulating wakefulness and sleep-wake transitions. The ARAS is in the midbrain reticular formation. It is mostly composed of various nuclei in the thalamus/hypothalamus and a number of dopaminergic, noradrenergic, serotonergic, histaminergic, cholinergic, and glutamatergic brain nuclei.

=== Structure ===
The ARAS is composed of several neural circuits connecting the dorsal part of the posterior midbrain and the ventral pons to the cerebral cortex via distinct pathways that project through the thalamus and hypothalamus. The ARAS is a collection of different nuclei – more than 20 on each side in the upper brainstem, the pons, medulla, and posterior hypothalamus. The neurotransmitters that these neurons release include dopamine, norepinephrine, serotonin, histamine, acetylcholine, and glutamate. They exert cortical influence through direct axonal projections and indirect projections through thalamic relays.

The thalamic pathway consists primarily of cholinergic neurons in the pontine tegmentum, whereas the hypothalamic pathway is composed primarily of neurons that release monoamine neurotransmitters, namely dopamine, norepinephrine, serotonin, and histamine. The glutamate-releasing neurons in the ARAS were identified much more recently relative to the monoaminergic and cholinergic nuclei; the glutamatergic component of the ARAS includes one nucleus in the hypothalamus and various brainstem nuclei. The orexin neurons of the lateral hypothalamus innervate every component of the ascending reticular activating system and coordinate activity within the entire system.

Key components of the ascending reticular activating system
Nucleus type	Corresponding nuclei that mediate arousal	Sources
Dopaminergic nuclei	Ventral tegmental area; Substantia nigra pars compacta	
Noradrenergic nuclei	Locus coeruleus; Dorsolateral pontine reticular formation; Other related noradrenergic brainstem nuclei	
Serotonergic nuclei	Dorsal raphe nucleus; Median raphe nucleus	
Histaminergic nuclei	Tuberomammillary nucleus	
Cholinergic nuclei	Basal forebrain cholinergic nuclei; Pontine tegmental nuclei: laterodorsal and pedunculopontine tegmental nucleus	
Glutamatergic nuclei	Brainstem nuclei: parabrachial nucleus, precoeruleus, and pedunculopontine tegmental nucleus; Hypothalamic nuclei: supramammillary nucleus	
Thalamic nuclei	Thalamic reticular nucleus; Intralaminar nucleus, including the centromedian nucleus	

The ARAS consists of evolutionarily ancient areas of the brain, which are crucial to the animal's survival and protected during adverse periods, such as during inhibitory periods of animal hypnosis also known as Totstellreflex. The ascending reticular activating system which sends neuromodulatory projections to the cortex - mainly connects to the prefrontal cortex. There seems to be low connectivity to the motor areas of the cortex.

=== Function ===
==== Consciousness ====
The ascending reticular activating system is an important enabling factor for the state of consciousness. The ascending system is seen to contribute to wakefulness as characterised by cortical and behavioural arousal.

==== Regulating sleep-wake transitions ====
The main function of the ARAS is to modify and potentiate thalamic and cortical function such that electroencephalogram (EEG) desynchronization ensues. (Note: An EEG's electrode on the scalp measures the activity of a very large number of pyramidal neurons in the underlying brain region. Each neuron generates a small electrical field that changes over time. In the sleep state, the neurons activate at approximately the same time, and the EEG wave, representing the summation of the neurons' electrical fields, tend to be in phase and has higher amplitude, and hence it is "synchronized." In the waking state, they do not activate at the same time because of irregular or out-of-phase inputs, the EEG wave, representing the algebraic sum, will have a smaller amplitude, and hence "dysynchronized.") There are distinct differences in the brain's electrical activity during periods of wakefulness and sleep: Low voltage fast burst brain waves (EEG desynchronization) are associated with wakefulness and REM sleep (which are electrophysiologically similar); high voltage slow waves are found during non-REM sleep. Generally speaking, when thalamic relay neurons are in burst mode the EEG is synchronized and when they are in tonic mode it is desynchronized. Stimulation of the ARAS produces EEG desynchronization by suppressing slow cortical waves (0.3–1 Hz), delta waves (1–4 Hz), and spindle wave oscillations (11–14 Hz) and by promoting gamma band (20–40 Hz) oscillations.

The physiological change from a state of deep sleep to wakefulness is reversible and mediated by the ARAS. The ventrolateral preoptic nucleus (VLPO) of the hypothalamus inhibits the neural circuits responsible for the awake state, and VLPO activation contributes to the sleep onset. During sleep, neurons in the ARAS will have a much lower firing rate; conversely, they will have a higher activity level during the waking state. In order that the brain may sleep, there must be a reduction in ascending afferent activity reaching the cortex by suppression of the ARAS. Dysfunction of the paraventricular nucleus of the hypothalamus can lead to drowsiness for up to 20 hours per day.

==== Attention ====
The ARAS also helps mediate transitions from relaxed wakefulness to periods of high attention. There is increased regional blood flow (presumably indicating an increased measure of neuronal activity) in the midbrain reticular formation (MRF) and thalamic intralaminar nuclei during tasks requiring increased alertness and attention.

==== Clinical significance of the ARAS ====
Damage to the ARAS nuclei may lead to effects ranging from temporary unconsciousness to coma or death.

Direct electrical stimulation of the ARAS produces pain responses in cats and elicits verbal reports of pain in humans. Ascending reticular activation in cats can produce mydriasis, which can result from prolonged pain. These results suggest some relationship between ARAS circuits and physiological pain pathways.

Some pathologies of the ARAS may be attributed to ageing, as there appears to be a general decline in reactivity of the ARAS with advancing years. Changes in electrical coupling (Note: Electrical coupling is the passive flow of electric current from one cell into an adjacent cell through gap junctions, such as the cells in the heart muscle or the neurons with electrical synapses. Electrically coupled cells fire synchronously because generated currents in one cell rapidly spread to the other cells.) have been suggested to account for some changes in ARAS activity: if coupling were down-regulated, there would be a corresponding decrease in higher-frequency synchronization (gamma band). Conversely, up-regulated electrical coupling would increase synchronization of fast rhythms that could lead to increased arousal and REM sleep drive. Specifically, disruption of the ARAS has been implicated in the following disorders:

- Narcolepsy: Lesions along the pedunculopontine (PPN) and laterodorsal tegmental nuclei are associated with narcolepsy. There is a significant down-regulation of PPN output and a loss of orexin peptides, promoting the excessive daytime sleepiness that is characteristic of this disorder.
- Progressive supranuclear palsy (PSP) : Dysfunction of nitric oxide signaling has been implicated in the development of PSP.
- Parkinson's disease: REM sleep disturbances are common in Parkinson's. It is mainly a dopaminergic disease, but cholinergic nuclei are depleted as well. Degeneration in the ARAS begins early in the disease process.

==== Developmental influences ====
There are several potential factors that may adversely influence the development of the ascending reticular activating system:

- Preterm birth: Regardless of birth weight or weeks of gestation, premature birth induces persistent deleterious effects on pre-attentional (arousal and sleep-wake abnormalities), attentional (reaction time and sensory gating), and cortical mechanisms throughout development.
- Smoking during pregnancy: Prenatal exposure to cigarette smoke is known to produce lasting arousal, attentional and cognitive deficits in humans. This exposure can induce up-regulation of α4β2 nicotinic receptors on cells of the pedunculopontine nucleus (PPN), resulting in increased tonic activity, resting membrane potential, and hyperpolarization-activated cation current. These major disturbances of the intrinsic membrane properties of PPN neurons result in increased levels of arousal and sensory gating, deficits (demonstrated by a diminished amount of habituation to repeated auditory stimuli). It is hypothesized that these physiological changes may intensify attentional dysregulation later in life.

=== Descending reticulospinal system ===
The reticulospinal tracts, are extrapyramidal motor tracts that descend from the reticular formation in two tracts to act on the motor neurons supplying the trunk and proximal limb flexors and extensors. The reticulospinal tracts are involved mainly in locomotion and postural control, although they do have other functions as well. The descending reticulospinal tracts are one of four major cortical pathways to the spinal cord for musculoskeletal activity. The reticulospinal tracts work with the other three pathways to give a coordinated control of movement, including delicate manipulations. The four pathways can be grouped into two main system pathways – a medial system and a lateral system. The medial system includes the reticulospinal tract and the vestibulospinal tract, and provides control of posture. The corticospinal tract and the rubrospinal tract belong to the lateral system which provides fine control of movement.

Spinal cord tracts - reticulospinal tract labeled in red, near-center at left in figure

The reticulospinal tracts are the medial reticulospinal tract, and the lateral reticulospinal tract.

- The medial reticulospinal tract (pontine) is responsible for exciting anti-gravity, extensor muscles. The fibers of this tract arise from the caudal pontine reticular nucleus and the oral pontine reticular nucleus and project to lamina VII and lamina VIII of the spinal cord.
- The lateral reticulospinal tract (medullary) is responsible for inhibiting excitatory axial extensor muscles of movement. It is also responsible for automatic breathing. The fibers of this tract arise from the medullary reticular formation, mostly from the gigantocellular nucleus, and descend the length of the spinal cord in the anterior part of the lateral white column (funiculus). The tract terminates in lamina VII mostly with some fibers terminating in lamina IX of the spinal cord.

The ascending sensory tract conveying information in the opposite direction is the spinoreticular tract.

==== Function ====
1. Integrates information from the motor systems to coordinate automatic movements of locomotion and posture
2. Facilitates and inhibits voluntary movement; influences muscle tone
3. Mediates autonomic functions
4. Modulates pain impulses
5. Influences blood flow to lateral geniculate nucleus of the thalamus.

==== Clinical significance ====
The reticulospinal tracts provide a pathway by which the hypothalamus can control sympathetic thoracolumbar outflow and parasympathetic sacral outflow.

Two major descending systems carrying signals from the brainstem and cerebellum to the spinal cord can trigger automatic postural response for balance and orientation: vestibulospinal tracts from the vestibular nuclei and reticulospinal tracts from the pons and medulla. Lesions of these tracts result in profound ataxia and postural instability.

Physical or vascular damage to the brainstem disconnecting the red nucleus (midbrain) and the vestibular nuclei (pons) may cause decerebrate rigidity, which has the neurological sign of increased muscle tone and hyperactive stretch reflexes. Responding to a startling or painful stimulus, both arms and legs extend and turn internally. The cause is the tonic activity of lateral vestibulospinal and reticulospinal tracts stimulating extensor motoneurons without the inhibitions from rubrospinal tract.

Brainstem damage above the red nucleus level may cause decorticate rigidity. Responding to a startling or painful stimulus, the arms flex and the legs extend. The cause is the red nucleus, via the rubrospinal tract, counteracting the extensor motorneuron's excitation from the lateral vestibulospinal and reticulospinal tracts. Because the rubrospinal tract only extends to the cervical spinal cord, it mostly acts on the arms by exciting the flexor muscles and inhibiting the extensors, rather than the legs.

Damage to the medulla below the vestibular nuclei may cause flaccid paralysis, hypotonia, loss of respiratory drive, and quadriplegia. There are no reflexes resembling early stages of spinal shock because of complete loss of activity in the motorneurons, as there is no longer any tonic activity arising from the lateral vestibulospinal and reticulospinal tracts.

== History ==
The term "reticular formation" was coined in the late 19th century by Otto Deiters, coinciding with Ramon y Cajal's neuron doctrine. Allan Hobson states in his book The Reticular Formation Revisited that the name is an etymological vestige from the fallen era of the aggregate field theory in the neural sciences. The term "reticulum" means "netlike structure", which is what the reticular formation resembles at first glance. It has been described as being either too complex to study or an undifferentiated part of the brain with no organization at all. Eric Kandel describes the reticular formation as being organized in a similar manner to the intermediate gray matter of the spinal cord. This chaotic, loose, and intricate form of organization is what has turned off many researchers from looking farther into this particular area of the brain. The cells lack clear ganglionic boundaries, but do have clear functional organization and distinct cell types. The term "reticular formation" is seldom used anymore except to speak in generalities. Modern scientists usually refer to the individual nuclei that compose the reticular formation.

Moruzzi and Magoun first investigated the neural components regulating the brain's sleep-wake mechanisms in 1949. Physiologists had proposed that some structure deep within the brain controlled mental wakefulness and alertness. It had been thought that wakefulness depended only on the direct reception of afferent (sensory) stimuli at the cerebral cortex.

As direct electrical stimulation of the brain could simulate electrocortical relays, Magoun used this principle to demonstrate, on two separate areas of the brainstem of a cat, how to produce wakefulness from sleep. He first stimulated the ascending somatic and auditory paths; second, a series of "ascending relays from the reticular formation of the lower brain stem through the midbrain tegmentum, subthalamus and hypothalamus to the internal capsule." The latter was of particular interest, as this series of relays did not correspond to any known anatomical pathways for the wakefulness signal transduction and was coined the ascending reticular activating system (ARAS).

Next, the significance of this newly identified relay system was evaluated by placing lesions in the medial and lateral portions of the front of the midbrain. Cats with mesencephalic interruptions to the ARAS entered into a deep sleep and displayed corresponding brain waves. In alternative fashion, cats with similarly placed interruptions to ascending auditory and somatic pathways exhibited normal sleeping and wakefulness, and could be awakened with physical stimuli. Because these external stimuli would be blocked on their way to the cortex by the interruptions, this indicated that the ascending transmission must travel through the newly discovered ARAS.

Finally, Magoun recorded potentials within the medial portion of the brain stem and discovered that auditory stimuli directly fired portions of the reticular activating system. Furthermore, single-shock stimulation of the sciatic nerve also activated the medial reticular formation, hypothalamus, and thalamus. Excitation of the ARAS did not depend on further signal propagation through the cerebellar circuits, as the same results were obtained following decerebellation and decortication. The researchers proposed that a column of cells surrounding the midbrain reticular formation received input from all the ascending tracts of the brain stem and relayed these afferents to the cortex and therefore regulated wakefulness.

== See also ==
- Medial pontine reticular formation
