= Posterolateral tract =

Spinal cord tract

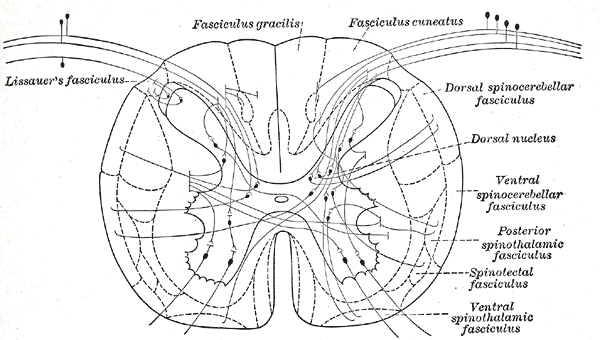
- Diagram showing a few of the connections of afferent (sensory) fibers of the posterior root with the efferent fibers from the ventral column and with the various long ascending fasciculi. (Lissauer's fasciculus visible in upper left.)

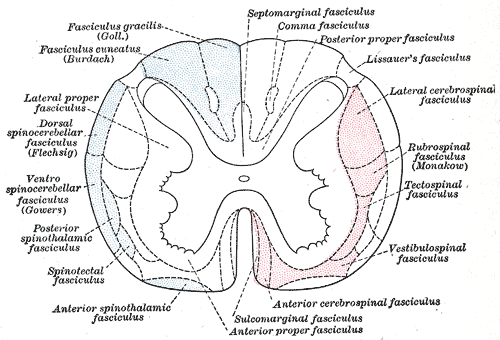
- Diagram of the principal fasciculi of the spinal cord. (Lissauer's fasciculus visible in upper right.)

Details

Identifiers
- Latin: tractus posterolateralis
- NeuroNames: 782
- NeuroLex ID: nlx_143969
- TA98: A14.1.02.228
- TA2: 6092
- FMA: 72616

The posterolateral tract (fasciculus of Lissauer, Lissauer's tract, tract of Lissauer, dorsolateral fasciculus, dorsolateral tract, zone of Lissauer) is a small strand situated in relation to the tip of the posterior column close to the entrance of the posterior nerve roots. It is present throughout the spinal cord, and is most developed in the upper cervical regions.

== Structure ==
The posterolateral tract contains centrally projecting axons from dorsal root ganglion cells carrying peripheral pain and temperature information (location, intensity and quality). These axons enter the spinal column and penetrate the grey matter of the dorsal horn, where they synapse on second-order neurons in either the substantia gelatinosa of Rolando or the nucleus proprius. Those neurons project their axon to the anterolateral quadrant of the contralateral half of the spinal cord, where they give the spinothalamic tract. The axons of second-order neurons ultimately synapse on neurons in the ventral posterior lateral nucleus (VPL) of the thalamus after coursing in the spinal lemniscus. After this, the 3rd order neuron fibers traverse the internal capsule and the corona radiata, ultimately synapsing in the post central gyrus (somatosensory cortex). The location of this synapse is dependent upon the somatotopic organisation of the somatosensory cortex, it can be estimated according to the position on the 'somatosensory homunculus'

The posterolateral tract consists of fine fibers which do not receive their myelin sheaths until toward the close of fetal life. In addition it contains great numbers of fine non-myelinated fibers derived mostly from the dorsal roots but partly endogenous in origin.

These fibers are intimately related to the substantia gelatinosa which is probably their terminal nucleus.

The non-myelinated fibers ascend or descend for short distances not exceeding one or two segments, but most of them enter the substantia gelatinosa at or near the level of their origin.

== Clinical significance ==
During a complete occlusion of the ventral artery of the spinal cord, it is the only tract spared along with the dorsal columns. The posterolateral spinal tracts are involved with neurological deficits seen in pernicious anemia.

== Eponym ==
The tract of Lissauer was named after German neurologist Heinrich Lissauer (1861–1891).
