= Commissure =

Anatomical location where two things cross or are joined

A commissure (/ˈkɒməʃər/) is the location at which two objects abut or are joined. The term is used especially in the fields of anatomy and biology.

- The most common usage of the term refers to the brain's commissures, of which there are at least nine. Such a commissure is a bundle of commissural fibers as a tract that crosses the midline at its level of origin or entry (as opposed to a decussation of fibers that cross obliquely). The nine are the anterior commissure, posterior commissure, corpus callosum, commissure of fornix (hippocampal commissure), habenular commissure, ventral supraoptic decussation, Meynert's commissure, anterior hypothalamic commissure of Gasner, and the interthalamic adhesion. They consist of fibre tracts that connect the two cerebral hemispheres and span the longitudinal fissure. In the spinal cord, there are the anterior white commissure, and the gray commissure. Commissural neurons refer to neuronal cells that grow their axons across the midline of the nervous system within the brain and the spinal cord.
- Commissure also often refers to cardiac anatomy of heart valves. In the heart, a commissure is the area where the valve leaflets abut. When such an abutment is abnormally stiffened or even fused, valvular stenosis results, sometimes requiring commissurotomy.
- The term may also refer to the junction of the upper and lower lips (see labial commissure of mouth).
- It may refer to the junction of the upper and lower mandibles of a bird's beak, or alternately, to the full-length apposition of the closed mandibles, from the corners of the mouth to the tip of the beak.
- It may refer to the nasal and temporal meeting points of the upper and lower eyelids (the medial and lateral canthi).
- In the vulva, the joining points of the two folds of the labia majora create two commissures—the anterior commissure just anterior to the prepuce of the clitoris, and the posterior commissure of the labia majora, directly posterior to the frenulum of the labia minora and anterior to the perineal raphe.

In biology, the meeting of the two valves of a brachiopod or clam is a commissure; in botany, the term is used to denote the place where a fern's laterally expanded vein endings come together in a continuous marginal sorus.

== See also ==
- Decussation
