= Kandaharia =

Scientific classification
- Kingdom: Plantae
- Clade: Tracheophytes
- Clade: Angiosperms
- Clade: Eudicots
- Clade: Asterids
- Order: Apiales
- Family: Apiaceae
- Subfamily: Apioideae
- Tribe: Tordylieae
- Subtribe: Tordyliinae
- Genus: Kandaharia; Alava
- Species: K. rechingerorum

Binomial name
- Kandaharia rechingerorum Alava

Species of flowering plant

Kandaharia is a monotypic genus of flowering plants belonging to the family Apiaceae. It only contains one known species, Kandaharia rechingerorum. It is in subfamily Apioideae and also tribe Tordylieae subtribe Tordyliinae.

It is native to Afghanistan.

== Description ==
They are pubescent perennials with bipinnate leaves, whose ultimate divisions are cuneate (wedge-shaped). It has small bracts and bracteoles. The flowers have white petals, which are dorsally pubescent (downy, covered in small hairs). The styles are recurved, with the stylopodium (a swelling on top of the ovary) is broadly depressed. The fruits (or seed capsules) are hirsute and orbicular or elliptic in shape. They are notched at the apex and strongly compressed dorsally. The dorsal ribs are filiform (thread-like) and the marginal ribs aare broadly winged (proximally thin and distally thickened). It has a fibrous inner mesocarp (fleshy wall), the commissure is broad. It has 3 vallecular vittae (resin canals), comissural 8 seed with faces plane.

== Taxonomy ==
The genus name of Kandaharia refers to the Afghan city of Kandahar. The Latin specific epithet of rechingerorum refers to Karl Heinz Rechinger, (1906-1998), an Austrian botanist and phytogeographer. Both the genus and the species were first described and published in Candollea Vol.31 on page 92 in 1976.
