= MPRF =

MPRF may refer to:

- Madheshi Jana Adhikar Forum, Nepal, a political party in Nepal
- Medial pontine reticular formation, a part of the brainstem involved in REM sleep
- Monetary policy reaction function
