= Spinothalamic tract =

Sensory pathway from the skin to the thalamus

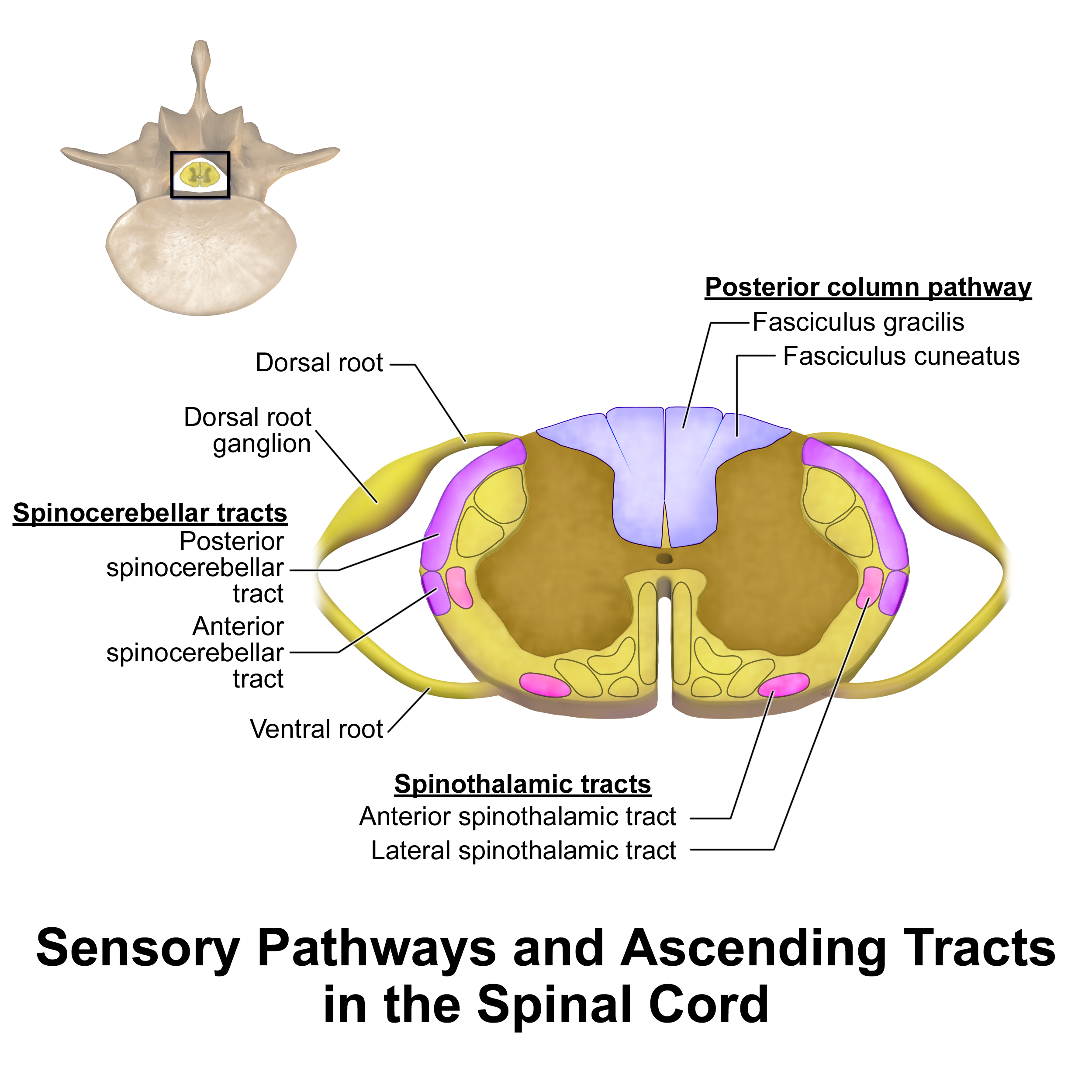
- Diagram showing the anterior and lateral spinothalamic tracts within the spinal cord -

Details
- Part of: Spinal cord
- System: Somatosensory system
- Decussation: Anterior white commissure
- Parts: Anterior and lateral tracts
- From: Skin
- To: Thalamus
- Artery: Anterior spinal artery
- Function: Gross touch and temperature

Identifiers
- Latin: tractus spinothalamicus
- MeSH: D013133
- NeuroNames: 2058, 810
- TA98: A14.1.04.138
- TA2: 6102
- FMA: 72644

The spinothalamic tract is a nerve tract in the anterolateral system in the spinal cord. This tract is an ascending sensory pathway to the thalamus. From the ventral posterolateral nucleus in the thalamus, sensory information is relayed upward to the somatosensory cortex of the postcentral gyrus.

The spinothalamic tract consists of two adjacent pathways: anterior and lateral. The anterior spinothalamic tract carries information about crude touch. The lateral spinothalamic tract conveys pain and temperature.

In the spinal cord, the spinothalamic tract has somatotopic organization. This is the segmental organization of its cervical, thoracic, lumbar, and sacral components, which is arranged from most medial to most lateral respectively.

The pathway crosses over (decussates) at the level of the spinal cord, rather than in the brainstem like the dorsal column-medial lemniscus pathway and lateral corticospinal tract. It is one of the three tracts which make up the anterolateral system: anterior and lateral spinothalamic tract, spinotectal tract, spinoreticular tract.

== Structure ==
The anterior and lateral spinothalamic tracts labelled at lower right as tracts of the anterolateral system.

There are two main parts of the spinothalamic tract:

- The lateral spinothalamic tract transmits pain and temperature.
- The anterior spinothalamic tract (or ventral spinothalamic tract) transmits crude touch and firm pressure.

The spinothalamic tract, like the dorsal column-medial lemniscus pathway, uses three neurons to convey sensory information from the periphery to conscious level at the cerebral cortex.

Pseudounipolar neurons in the dorsal root ganglion have axons that lead from the skin into the dorsal spinal cord where they ascend or descend one or two vertebral levels via Lissauer's tract and then synapse with secondary neurons in either the substantia gelatinosa of Rolando or the nucleus proprius. These secondary neurons are called tract cells.

The axons of the tract cells cross over (decussate) to the other side of the spinal cord via the anterior white commissure, and to the anterolateral corner of the spinal cord (hence the spinothalamic tract being part of the anterolateral system). Decussation usually occurs 1-2 spinal nerve segments above the point of entry. The axons travel up the length of the spinal cord into the brainstem, specifically the rostral ventromedial medulla.

Traveling up the brainstem, the tract moves dorsally. The neurons ultimately synapse with third-order neurons in several nuclei of the thalamus—including the medial dorsal, ventral posterior lateral, and ventral posterior medial nuclei. From there, signals go to the cingulate cortex, the primary somatosensory cortex, and insular cortex respectively.

=== Anterior spinothalamic tract ===
The anterior spinothalamic tract (Latin: tractus spinothalamicus anterior) or ventral spinothalamic fasciculus situated in the marginal part of the anterior funiculus and intermingled more or less with the vestibulospinal tract, is derived from cells in the posterior column or intermediate gray matter of the opposite side. Aβ fibres carry sensory information pertaining to crude touch from the skin. After entering the spinal cord the first order neurons synapse (in the nucleus proprius), and the second order neurons decussate via the anterior white commissure. These second order neurons ascend synapsing in the VPL of the thalamus. Incoming first order neurons can ascend or descend via the Lissauer tract.

Its fibers convey crude touch information to the VPL (ventral posterolateral nucleus) of the thalamus.

The fibers of the anterior spinothalamic tract conduct information about pressure and crude touch (protopathic). The fine touch (epicritic) is conducted by fibers of the medial lemniscus. The medial lemniscus is formed by the axons of the neurons of the gracilis and cuneatus nuclei of the medulla oblongata which receive information about light touch, vibration and conscient proprioception from the gracilis and cuneatus fasciculus of the spinal cord. This fasciculus receive the axons of the first order neuron which is located in the dorsal root ganglion that receives afferent fibers from receptors in the skin, muscles and joints.

High-resolution RNA sequencing finds the anterior spinothalamic tract has five distinct types of neurons. Three clusters of which are located mainly in laminae I–III of the dorsal horn and two clusters in deeper laminae.

=== Lateral spinothalamic tract ===
The lateral spinothalamic tract (or lateral spinothalamic fasciculus), is a bundle of afferent nerve fibers ascending through the white matter of the spinal cord, in the spinothalamic tract, carrying sensory information to the brain. It carries pain, and temperature sensory information (protopathic sensation) to the thalamus. It is composed primarily of fast-conducting, sparsely myelinated A delta fibers and slow-conducting, unmyelinated C fibers. These are secondary sensory neurons which have already synapsed with the primary sensory neurons of the peripheral nervous system in the posterior horn of the spinal cord (one of the three grey columns).

There is evidence to suggest the existence of a projection from lamina I and deeper layers of the dorsal horn to the ventrobasal complex and other thalamic nuclei, eventually passing pain and temperature information to the SI and SII somatosensory cortices. In macaque monkeys, neurons from the posterior part of the ventral medial nucleus terminate at the posterior half of the superior limiting sulcus that bounds the dorsal insular cortext.

Together with the anterior spinothalamic tract, the lateral spinothalamic tract is sometimes termed the secondary sensory fasciculus or spinal lemniscus.

==== Anatomy ====
The neurons of the lateral spinothalamic tract originate in the spinal dorsal root ganglia. They project peripheral processes to the tissues in the form of free nerve endings which are sensitive to molecules indicative of cell damage. The central processes enter the spinal cord in an area at the back of the posterior horn known as the posterolateral tract. Here, the processes ascend approximately two levels before synapsing on second-order neurons. These secondary neurons are situated in the posterior horn, specifically in the Rexed laminae regions I, IV, V and VI. Region II is primarily composed of Golgi II interneurons, which are primarily for the modulation of pain, and largely project to secondary neurons in regions I and V. Secondary neurons from regions I and V decussate across the anterior white commissure and ascend in the (now contralateral) lateral spinothalamic tract. These fibers will ascend through the brainstem, including the medulla oblongata, pons and midbrain, as the spinal lemniscus until synapsing in the ventroposteriorlateral (VPL) nucleus of the thalamus. The third order neurons in the thalamus will then project through the internal capsule and corona radiata to various regions of the cortex, primarily the primary somatosensory cortex (Brodmann areas 3, 1, and 2).

== Function ==
The types of sensory information means that the sensation is accompanied by a reflex.

There are two sub-systems identified:

- Direct (for direct conscious appreciation of pain)
- Indirect (for affective and arousal impact of pain)

Indirect projections include:

  - The spino-reticulo-thalamo-cortical, which is anpart of the ascending reticular activating system (ARAS)
  - The spino-mesencephalic-limbic, which contributes to the affective impact of pain

=== Anterolateral system ===
The anterolateral system (ALS) is an ascending bundle of fibers in the spinal cord, carried in three main pathways or nerve tracts. The tracts convey pain, temperature (protopathic sensation), and crude touch from the periphery to the brain. The most important of these is the spinothalamic tract.

Name	Destination	Function
spinothalamic tract (lateral and anterior)	thalamus	important in the localization of painful or thermal stimuli
spinoreticular tract	reticular formation	causes alertness and arousal in response to painful stimuli
spinotectal tract	tectum	orients the eyes and head towards the stimuli

== Clinical significance ==
In contrast to the axons of second-order neurons in the dorsal column-medial lemniscus pathway, the axons of second-order neurons in the spinothalamic tracts cross at every segmental level in the spinal cord. This fact aids in determining whether a lesion is in the brain or the spinal cord. With lesions in the brain stem or above, deficits of pain perception, touch sensation, and proprioception are all contralateral to the lesion. With spinal cord lesions, however, the deficit in pain perception is contralateral to the lesion, whereas the other deficits are ipsilateral, as seen in Brown-Séquard syndrome.

Unilateral lesions usually cause contralateral anaesthesia (loss of pain and temperature). Anaesthesia typically begins 1–2 segments below the level of the lesion, because the sensory fibers are carried by the dorsal-lateral tract of Lissauer up several levels upon entry into the spinal cord, and it affects all caudal body areas. This is clinically tested using pinpricks.

== See also ==
- Periaqueductal gray
- Neothalamus
