= Perl-UNC Prize =

Perl-UNC Neuroscience Prize
- Sponsored by: UNC-Chapel Hill School of Medicine
- Date: 2000
- Country: United States
- Reward: USD $20,000
- Website: Website

The Perl-UNC Prize is awarded internationally in the field of neuroscience. Its purpose is two-fold: to recognize researchers for outstanding discoveries and seminal insights in neuroscience and to celebrate the strength of the neuroscience research program at the University of North Carolina at Chapel Hill.

== Creation ==
Edward Perl (1926-2014), a neuroscientist and former professor of Cell Biology & Physiology at the University of North Carolina School of Medicine, established the prize in 2000 to recognize outstanding scientific contribution in neuroscience. He had envisioned that the selection committee would choose recipients "from a broad field of neuroscience ranging from development to molecular mechanisms to integrative function." Perl further noted that "[t]he prize allows me to acknowledge the university for the opportunities it has given me" and that it "would help call attention to the institution and our strength in neuroscience."

As of 2017, six recipients of the Perl-UNC Prize have gone on to win Nobel Prizes in Physiology or Medicine (Linda Buck, Richard Axel, May-Britt Moser, Edvard Moser) or Chemistry (Roger Tsien, Roderick MacKinnon). Three winners of the Perl-UNC Prize (Thomas Jessell, Cori Bargmann, Marcus Raichle) have been awarded the Kavli Prize in Neuroscience.

== Recipients ==
Source: UNC Neuroscience Center

- 2000 David Julius, Cloning the Capsaicin Receptor.
- 2001 Roderick MacKinnon, Solving the Crystal Structure of the Potassium Channel.
- 2002 Linda Buck and Richard Axel, Discovery of the Family of Olfactory Receptor Proteins.
- 2003 Yves Barde, Discovery of Brain-Derived Neurotrophic Factor.
- 2004 Roger Tsien, Development of Tools for Monitoring Signaling in Living Nerve Cells.
- 2005 Robert Malenka and Roger Nicoll, Discovery of Mechanisms that Underlie Long-term Synaptic Plasticity.
- 2006 Solomon H. Snyder, Identification of Opiate Receptors in the Brain.
- 2007 Huda Zoghbi, Discovery of the Genetic Basis of Rett Syndrome.
- 2008 Michael E. Greenberg, Discovery of Signaling Pathways Underlying Activity-Regulated Gene Transcription.
- 2009 Thomas Jessell, Defining Molecular Mechanisms that Regulate the Development of Neural Circuits.
- 2010 Catherine Dulac and Cori Bargmann, Discovery of Chemosensitive Circuits that Regulate Social Behaviors.
- 2011 Karl Deisseroth, Edward Boyden, and Feng Zhang, Development and Application of Optogenetics for Studying Neural Circuit Functions.
- 2012 Edvard Moser and May-Britt Moser, Discovery of Key Principles Governing the Internal Representation of Space and Episodic Memory.
- 2013 Marcus Raichle, Discoveries Relating to the "Default Mode Network" of Brain Function.
- 2014 David W. Tank, Discovery of Fundamental Mechanisms of Neural Computation.
- 2015 Christopher A. Walsh, Discovery of Genes and Mechanisms Regulating Human Cortical Development.
- 2016 David J. Anderson, Discovery of neural circuit mechanisms controlling emotional behaviors.
- 2017 Doris Tsao and Winrich Freiwald, Discovery of brain mechanisms of face recognition.
- 2018 S. Lawrence Zipursky and Joshua R. Sanes, Discovery of cell-surface proteins that control circuit assembly in the visual system
- 2019 Lily Jan and Yuh-Nung Jan, Discovery and functional characterization of potassium channels

== Selection committee ==
Current members are William Snider (Chair), Tom Albright, Vanessa Ruta, Julie Kauer, Regina Carelli, Ben Philpot, and Mark Zylka.

== See also ==
- List of neuroscience awards
