= Group B nerve fiber =

One of the three classes of nerve fiber

Group B nerve fibers are one of the three classes of nerve fiber as generally classified by Erlanger and Gasser. They are moderately myelinated, which means less myelinated than group A nerve fibers, and more myelinated than group C nerve fibers. They have a medium conduction velocity of 3 to 14 m/s. They are usually general visceral afferent fibers and preganglionic nerve fibers of the autonomic nervous system. They are used in Bainbridge reflex as afferents.
