= David J. Anderson =

American neurobiologist (born 1956)

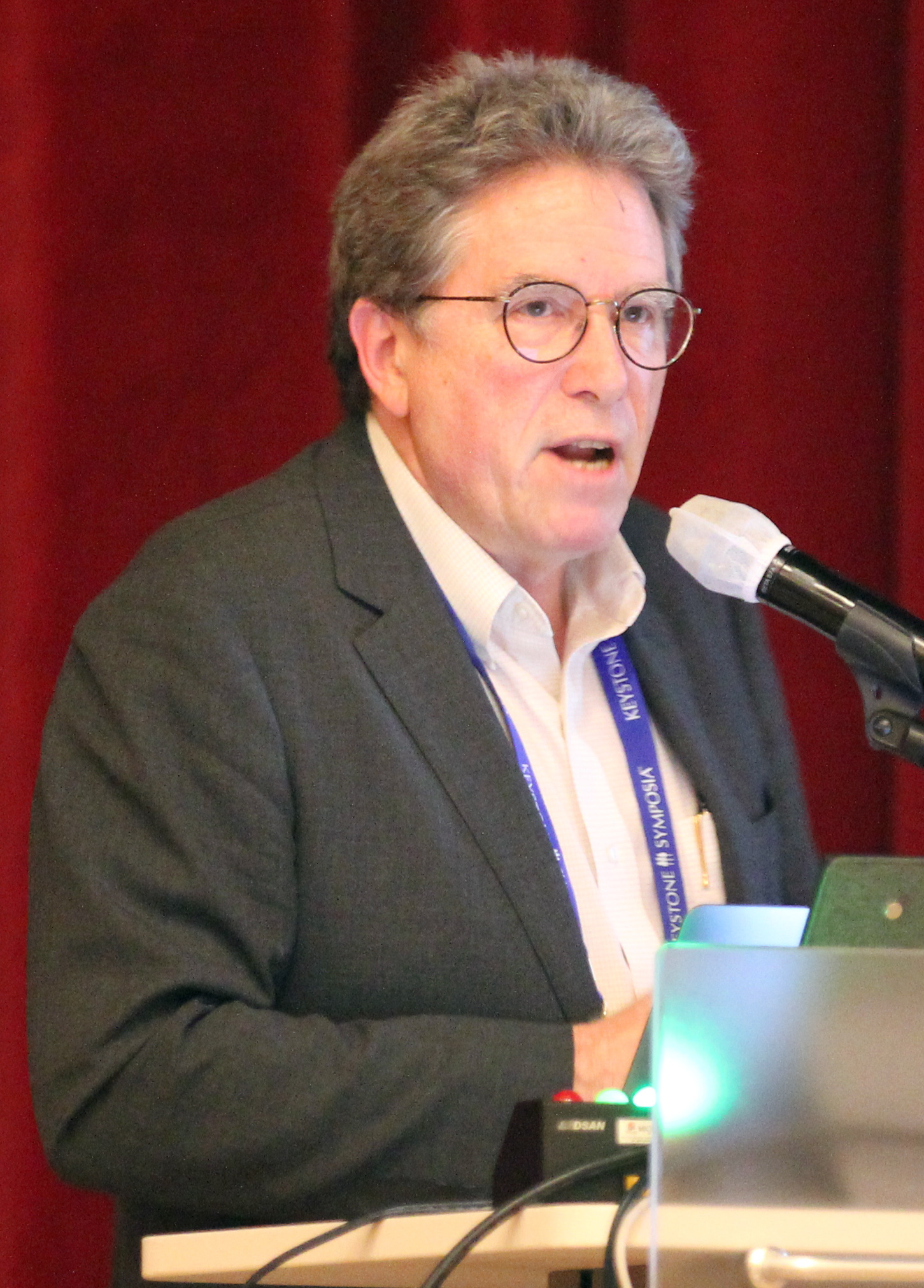
- Born: 1956 (age 69–70)
- Education: Harvard University (BA); Rockefeller University (PhD)
- Awards: W. Alden Spencer Award (1999)
- Scientific career
- Fields: Cell biology
- Workplaces: California Institute of Technology
- Doctoral advisor: Günter Blobel
- Other academic advisors: Richard Axel

David Jeffrey Anderson (born 1956) is an American neurobiologist. He is a Howard Hughes Medical Institute investigator. His lab is located at the California Institute of Technology, where he currently holds the position of Seymour Benzer Professor of Biology, TianQiao and Chrissy Chen Leadership Chair and Director, TianQiao and Chrissy Chen Institute for Neuroscience. Anderson is a founding adviser of the Allen Institute for Brain Research, a non-profit research institute funded by the late Paul G. Allen, and spearheaded the Institute's early effort to generate a comprehensive map of gene expression in the mouse brain.

He is the author of The Neuroscience of Emotion: A New Synthesis with Caltech neuroscientist Ralph Adolfs.

== Education ==
Anderson earned a Bachelor of Arts, summa cum laude, in biochemical sciences from Harvard University in 1978 with membership in Phi Beta Kappa. He then received a Ph.D. in 1983 in cell biology from Rockefeller University, where trained under Nobel laureate Günter Blobel. He was a postdoctoral fellow at Columbia University in 1986 and researched under Nobel laureate Richard Axel.

== Research ==
Anderson's work (mid 1980s–early 2000s) focused on the development and function of the nervous system, particularly the mechanism of fate determination of neural stem cells. His laboratory's current focus is to dissect genes and neural circuits underlying innate behaviors and associated emotion states, such as fear and aggression.

At Caltech, Anderson has overseen projects such as studying aggression in fruit flies. He has also studied the mechanisms of fear and touch, and the neural activity in the brains of mice during social behaviors such as mating and aggression.

== Awards and honors ==
Anderson received an NSF Presidential Young Investigator Award in 1986, the 1999 Alden Spencer Award from Columbia University, and a Paul G. Allen Distinguished Investigator Award in 2010. In 2017, he won the 17th Perl-UNC Neuroscience Prize and in 2018, he won the Edward M. Scolnick Prize in Neuroscience.

He was elected a Fellow of the American Academy of Arts and Sciences in 2002. In 2007, he was elected a member of the National Academy of Sciences.

== Select publications ==
- Anderson, David J; Adolphs, Ralph (5 June 2018), The Neuroscience of Emotion: A New Synthesis, Princeton University Press, ISBN 9780691174082
- Anderson, David J (15 March 2022), The Nature of the Beast: How Emotions Guide Us, Basic Books, ISBN 9781541674646
