= Oral pontine reticular nucleus =

Brainstem structure

Details

Identifiers
- Latin: nucleus reticularis pontis oralis
- NeuroNames: 565
- NeuroLex ID: birnlex_875
- TA98: A14.1.05.503
- TA2: 5950
- FMA: 72468

The oral pontine reticular nucleus, or rostral pontine reticular nucleus is one of the two components of the medial (efferent/motor) zone of the pontine reticular formation - the other being the caudal pontine reticular nucleus. The efferents of these two structures together give rise to the medial (pontine) reticulospinal tract (which modulates the muscle tone of the trunk and limb musculature). A population of their neurons together also form the paramedian pontine reticular formation which is involved in the coordination of horizontal conjugate eye movements in response to head movements.

== Anatomy ==
This nucleus tapers rostrally to transition into the caudal mesencephalic reticular formation. It contains sporadic giant neurons.

=== Afferents ===
It receives sensory and motor cortical afferents via corticoreticular fibers.

== Research ==
Different populations of the pontis oralis have displayed discharge patterns which coordinate with phasic movements to and from paradoxical sleep. It is thus apparently involved in the mediation of changing to and from REM sleep.
