= István Aranyosi =

Hungarian philosopher (born 1975)

- Born: 1975 (age 50–51)

Education
- Education: University of Bucharest (BA); Central European University (PhD)
- Thesis: Physicalism and Consciousness: A Defence of Commonsense Functionalism (2005)
- Doctoral advisors: Howard Robinson; Ferenc Huoranszki
- Other advisors: Barry Dainton; David Chalmers

Philosophical work
- Era: 21st-century philosophy
- Region: Western philosophy
- School: Analytic philosophy
- Institutions: Bilkent University
- Main interests: philosophy of mind, philosophy of cognitive science, metaphysics
- Website: http://istvanaranyosi.net/

István Aranyosi (born 1975) is a Hungarian philosopher and Assistant Professor of Philosophy at Bilkent University. He is best known for his works on philosophy of mind and metaphysics.

== Books ==
- The Peripheral Mind: Philosophy of Mind and the Peripheral Nervous System, Oxford University Press, 2013
- God, Mind and Logical Space: A Revisionary Approach to Divinity, Palgrave Macmillan, 2013

== See also ==
- Hard problem of consciousness
- Group C nerve fiber#Philosophical relevance
