= Heinrich Lissauer =

German neurologist (1861–1891)

Heinrich Lissauer (12 September 1861 – 21 September 1891) was a German neurologist born in Neidenburg (today Nidzica, Poland). He was the son of archaeologist Abraham Lissauer (1832–1908).

He studied at the Universities of Heidelberg, Berlin and Leipzig. He was a neurologist at the psychiatric hospital in Breslau, and was a one-time assistant to Carl Wernicke.

In 1885 he provided a description of the dorso-lateral tract, a bundle of fibers between the apex of the posterior horn and the surface of the spinal marrow, that was to become known as "Lissauer's tract". Another eponymous term associated with Lissauer is "Lissauer's paralysis", a condition that is an apoplectic type of general paresis.

Among his written works was an influential treatise on visual agnosia, being referred to as Seelenblindheit in 19th-century German medicine, a term that roughly translates to "mind blindness". Lissauer died in Hallstatt, Austria on 21 September 1891 at the age of 30.

== Written works ==
- Beitrag zur pathologische Anatomie des Tabes dorsalis und zum Faserverlauf in menschlichen Rückenmark. Neurologisches Centralblatt, 1885, 4: 245-246.
- Beitrag zum Faserverlauf im Hinterhorn des menschlichen Rückenmarks und zum Verhalten desselben bei Tabes Dorsalis.
- Ein Fall von Seelenblindheit, nebst einem Beitrag zur Theorie derselben. In: Archiv für Psychiatrie und Nervenkrankheiten, Jg. 21 (1890), S. 222-270.
- Sehhügelveränderungen bei progressiver Paralyse. In: Deutsche Medizinische Wochenschrift, Jg. 16 (1890).
