= Abraham Lissauer =

German physician and archaeologist

Abraham Lissauer (29 August 1832 – 29 September 1908) was a German physician and archaeologist born in Berent, Province of Prussia (today- Kościerzyna, Poland). He was the father of neurologist Heinrich Lissauer (1861–1891).

He studied at the Universities of Berlin and Vienna, gaining his medical doctorate in 1856. From 1856 to 1863 he practiced medicine in Lautenburg and Neidenburg, and afterwards was a physician in Danzig. During his spare time he performed research in the fields of anthropology, ethnography and archaeology.

In 1892 he relocated to Berlin, where he dedicated his time entirely to scientific research. Here he became custodian and librarian of the Anthropological Society of Berlin. Among his publications are works on archaeology as well as medicine:

- Zur Antipyretischen Behandlung des Typhus Abdominalis, in Virchow's Archiv, liii.
- Ueber den Alkoholgehalt des Bieres, 1865
- Ueber das Eindringen von Canalgasen in die Wohnräume, 1881
- Untersuchungen über die Sagittale Krümmung des Schädels, 1885
- Die Prähistorischen Denkmäler der Provinz West-Preussen, (Antiquities of the Bronze Age in the Province of West Prussia), 1887
- Altertümer der Bronzezeit in der Provinz West-Preussen (Prehistoric monuments in the Province of West Prussia), 1891
