= Paramedian reticular nucleus =

Neuron cluster of the brain stem

Details

Identifiers
- Latin: paramedian nucleus reticularis
- NeuroNames: 734
- NeuroLex ID: nlx_151902
- TA98: A14.1.05.505
- TA2: 5949
- FMA: 72583

The paramedian reticular nucleus (in Terminologia Anatomica, or paramedian medullary reticular group in NeuroNames) sends its connections to the spinal cord in a mostly ipsilateral manner, although there is some decussation.

It projects to the vermis in the anterior lobe, the pyramis and the uvula.

The paramedian nucleus also projects to the contralateral PRN, the gigantocellular nucleus, and the nucleus ambiguous.

The paramedian reticular formation is adjacent to the abducens (VI)nucleus in the pons and adjacent to the oculomotor nucleus(III) in the midbrain.

The paramedian nucleus receives afferents mostly from the fastigial nucleus in the cerebellum and the cerebral cortex; however, the projections from the spinal cord are very sparse.

The descending afferent connections come mostly from the frontal and parietal lobes; however the pontine reticular formation also sends projections to the paramedian reticular nucleus.

There are also very sparse innervations from the superior colliculus.

Lesions in the paramedian reticular nucleus have been shown to cause a stereotyped increase in the random patterns of motion in rats. The paramedian nuclei on either side of the brain stem have been shown to mediate the horizontal eye movements on their ipsilateral sides. It seems possible that the random motion patterns of the above rats were caused by an inability to mediate their horizontal eye movements.

== See also ==
- Paramedian pontine reticular formation
