= Medial pontine reticular formation =

The medial pontine reticular formation (MPRF) is a part of the human brain located in the pons of the brainstem (specifically the central pontine reticular formation). It plays a critical function in the generation of REM sleep.

== Role in REM sleep ==
GABAergic neurons of the MPRF are activated by acetylcholine (released by the Pedunculopontine tegmental nucleus), and in turn activate cells in the basal forebrain — namely, the Dorsal raphe nucleus (which produces serotonin) and the Locus coeruleus (which produces norepinephrine). This activation will stimulate cortical activity, which is characteristic of the low-amplitude/high-frequency EEG patterns observed during REM sleep. As well, lesions of the MPRF will cause a great decrease of REM sleep.
