= Marginal nucleus of spinal cord =

Spinal cord region involved in sensory processing

- Medulla spinalis (Rexed lamina I labeled at upper left.)

Details

Identifiers
- Latin: nucleus marginalis medullae spinalis, lamina spinalis I
- NeuroNames: 2138
- TA98: A14.1.02.117
- TA2: 6065
- FMA: 68862

The marginal nucleus of spinal cord, posteromarginal nucleus, or spinal lamina 1 (Rexed lamina 1) is located at the most dorsal aspect of the posterior grey column of the spinal cord. The neurons located here receive input primarily from Lissauer's tract and relay information related to pain and temperature sensation. Pain sensation relayed here cannot be modulated, e.g. pain from burning the skin. The axons of neurons contribute to the lateral spinothalamic tract.
