= Labial commissure of mouth =

- Fourteen nylon sutures used to approximate the edges of this left cheek laceration, extending from the left commissure towards the left ear, allowing it to heal with considerably less scarring than it would without sutures.

Details

Identifiers
- Latin: commissura labiorum oris
- TA98: A05.1.01.012
- TA2: 224
- FMA: 77268

The commissure is the corner of the mouth, where the vermillion border of the superior labium (upper lip) meets that of the inferior labium (lower lip).

The commissure is important in facial appearance, particularly during some functions, including smiling. As such it is of interest to dental surgeons.

Diseases that involve the commissure include angular chelitis.

== See also ==
- Commissure
