= Grey commissure =

Grey matter strip around the spinal cord

- Medulla spinalis - Substantia grisea

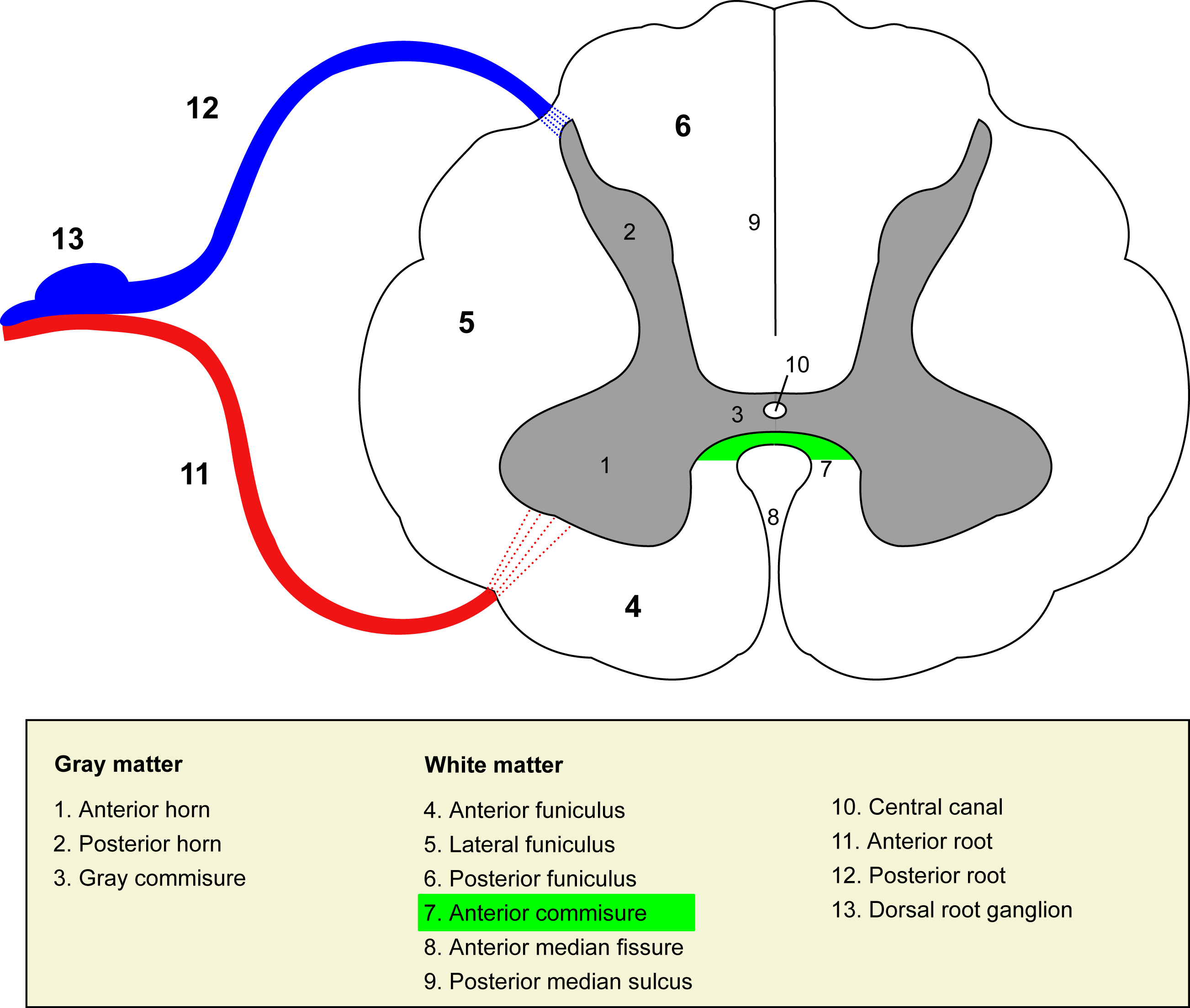
- Spinal cord. (Grey commissure is #3, near center.)

Details

Identifiers
- Latin: commissura grisea anterior medullae spinalis, commissura grisea posterior medullae spinalis
- NeuroNames: 1665, 1649
- FMA: 77036

The grey commissure is a thin strip of grey matter that surrounds the central canal of the spinal cord and, along with the anterior white commissure, connects the two halves of the cord. It comprises lamina X in the Rexed classification.
