= Ventral root of spinal nerve =

Efferent motor root of a spinal nerve

- The formation of the spinal nerve from the dorsal and ventral roots

Details

Identifiers
- Latin: radix anterior nervi spinalis
- TA98: A14.2.00.029
- TA2: 6145
- FMA: 5979

In anatomy and neurology, the ventral root of spinal nerve, anterior root, or motor root is the efferent motor root of a spinal nerve.

At its distal end, the ventral root joins with the dorsal root to form a mixed spinal nerve.

== Additional images ==
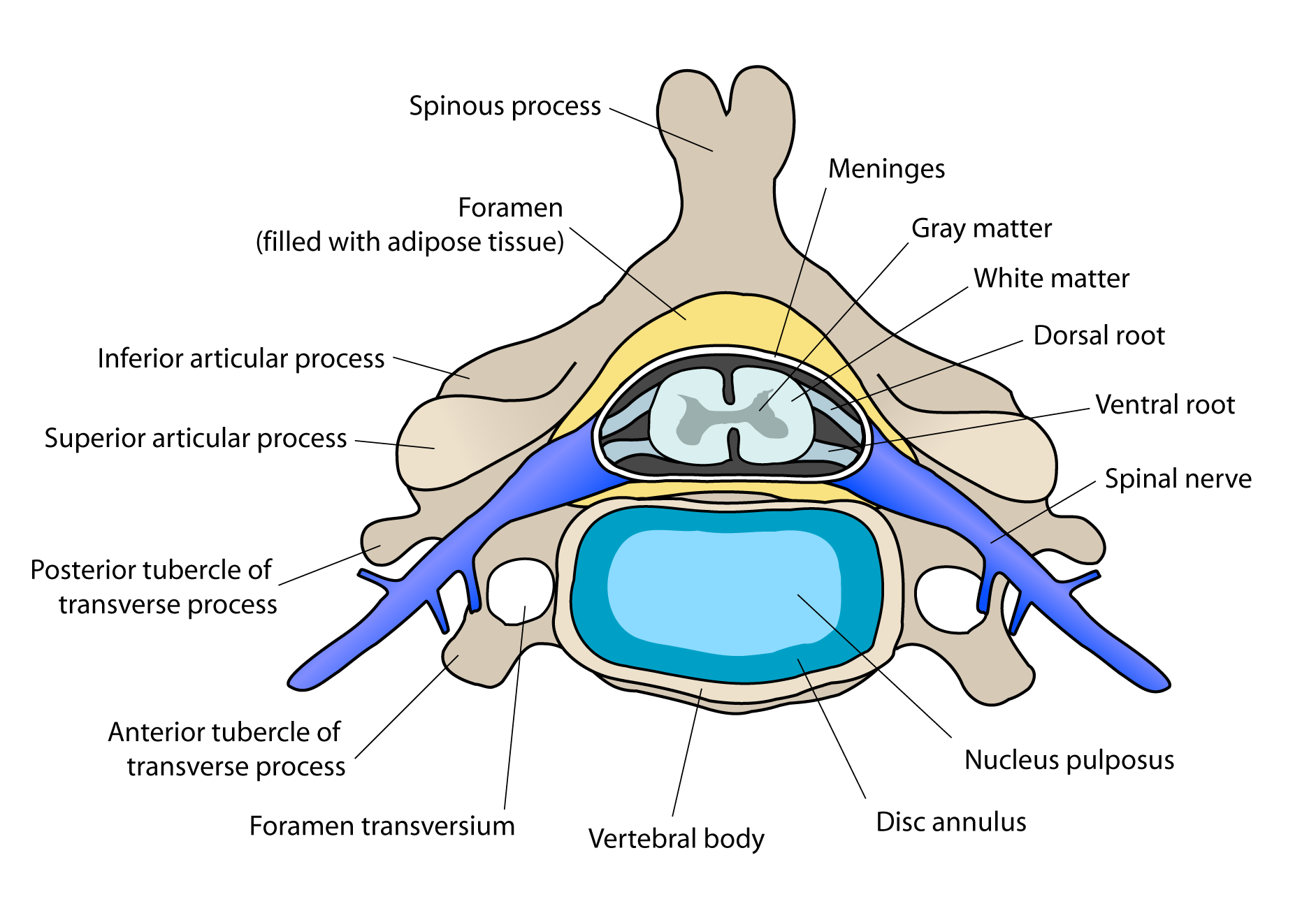
Cervical vertebra

Medulla spinalis

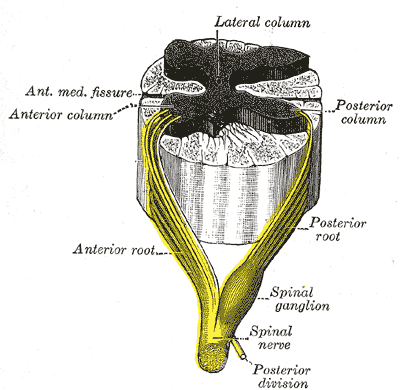
A spinal nerve with its anterior and posterior.

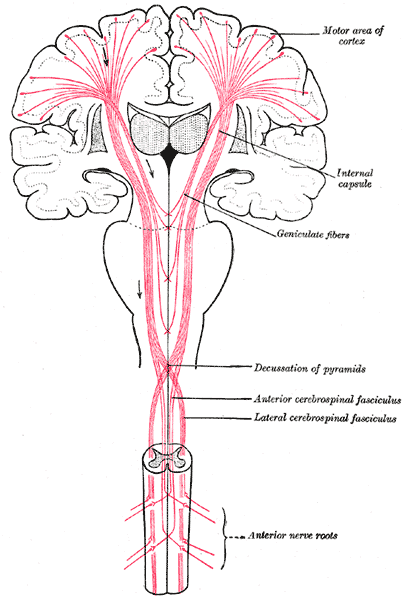
The motor tract.

Diagrammatic transverse section of the medulla spinalis and its membranes.

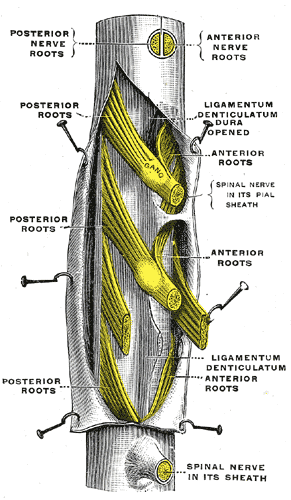
A portion of the spinal cord, showing its right lateral surface. The dura is opened and arranged to show the nerve roots.

Scheme showing structure of a typical spinal nerve.
