= Lateral reticular nucleus =

Neuron cluster of the medulla

Details

Identifiers
- Latin: nucleus reticularis lateralis medullae oblongatae
- NeuroNames: 727
- NeuroLex ID: nlx_anat_20081246
- TA98: A14.1.04.308
- TA2: 6032
- FMA: 72574

The lateral reticular nucleus, of the lateral funiculus, can be divided into three subnuclei, the parvocellular, magnocellular and the subtrigeminal. As is typical of the reticular formation, none of these are very distinct subnuclei, but rather blurred distinctions between cell types and location. The lateral reticular nucleus sends all of its projections to the cerebellum.

- The parvocellular portion of the LRN and the immediately adjacent magnocellular portion send most their projections to the vermis of the cerebellum. The rest of the magnocellular subnucleus sends its projections to the hemisphere regions of the cerebellum.
- The subtrigeminal nucleus sends its projections to the flocculonodular lobe.

All of these efferent pathways are projected in an ipsilateral manner to the cerebellum, the most abundant of which are those to the vermis.

This nucleus is also involved in the mediation of inspiration (in-breathing) with a part of the ventral r. nucleus.

The afferent pathways to the LRN come from the spinal cord and higher brain structures.

Most of the afferents come from the ipsilateral dorsal horn of the spinal cord and project exclusively to the parts of the LRN that do not receive input from the cortex.

The spinal cord projections terminate mostly in the parvocellular region along with the adjacent magnocellular cells.

This implies that most input from the spinal cord is relayed into the vermis.
