= Dorsal root of spinal nerve =

Part of the spinal cord

- The formation of the spinal nerve from the dorsal and ventral roots

Details

Identifiers
- Latin: radix posterior nervi spinalis
- TA98: A14.2.00.030
- TA2: 6146
- FMA: 5980

The dorsal root of spinal nerve (or posterior root of spinal nerve or sensory root) is one of two "roots" which emerge from the spinal cord. It emerges directly from the spinal cord and travels to the dorsal root ganglion. Nerve fibres with the ventral root then combine to form a spinal nerve. The dorsal root transmits sensory information, forming the afferent sensory root of a spinal nerve.

== Structure ==
The root emerges from the posterior part of the spinal cord and travels to the dorsal root ganglion. The dorsal root ganglia contain the pseudo-unipolar cell bodies of the nerve fibres which travel from the ganglia through the root into the spinal cord.

The lateral division of the dorsal root contains lightly myelinated and unmyelinated fibres of small diameter. These carry pain and temperature sensation. These fibers cross through the anterior white commissure to form the anterolateral system in the lateral funiculus.

The medial division of the dorsal root contains myelinated fibres of larger diameter. These transmit information of discriminative touch, pressure, vibration, and conscious proprioception originating from spinal levels C2 through S5. These fibers are pushed in towards the posterior median sulcus to form the gracile fasciculus and the cuneate fasciculus of the posterior column–medial lemniscus pathway. If the dorsal root of a spinal nerve were severed, it would lead to numbness in certain areas of the body.

== Additional images ==
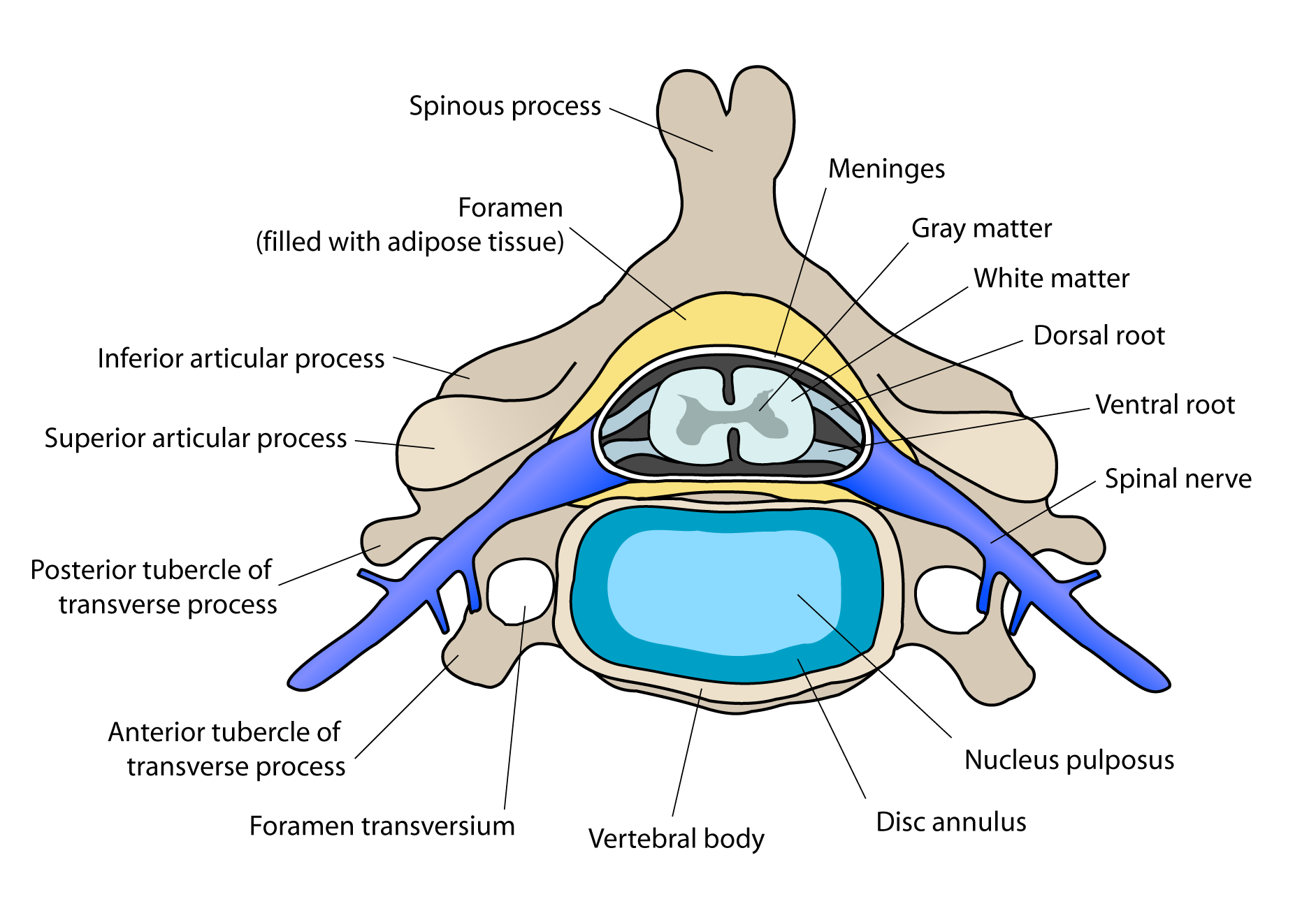
Cervical vertebra

Medulla spinalis

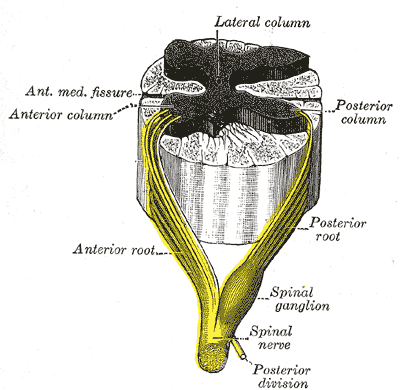
A spinal nerve with its anterior and posterior roots

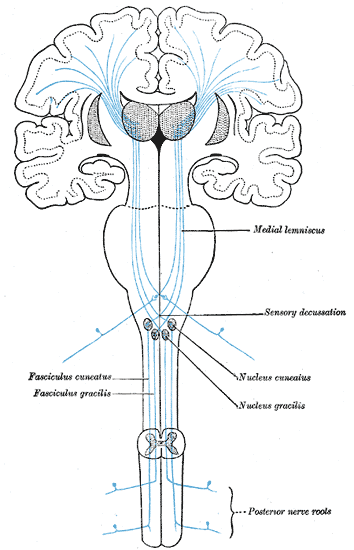
The sensory tract

Diagrammatic transverse section of the medulla spinalis and its membranes

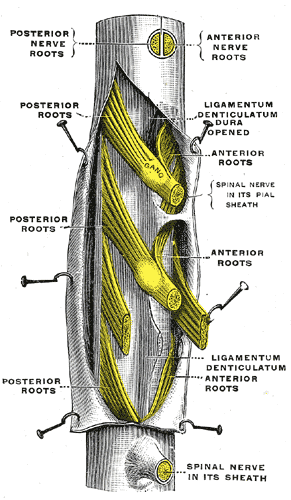
A portion of the spinal cord, showing its right lateral surface. The dura is opened and arranged to show the nerve roots.

Scheme showing structure of a typical spinal nerve
