= Anterior white commissure =

Bundle of nerve fibers

Anterior white commissure of the spinal cord
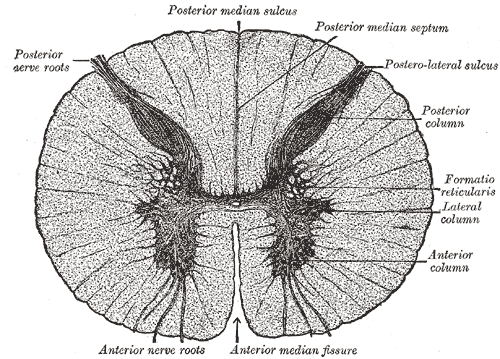
- Fig. 664– Transverse section of the spinal cord in the mid-thoracic region.

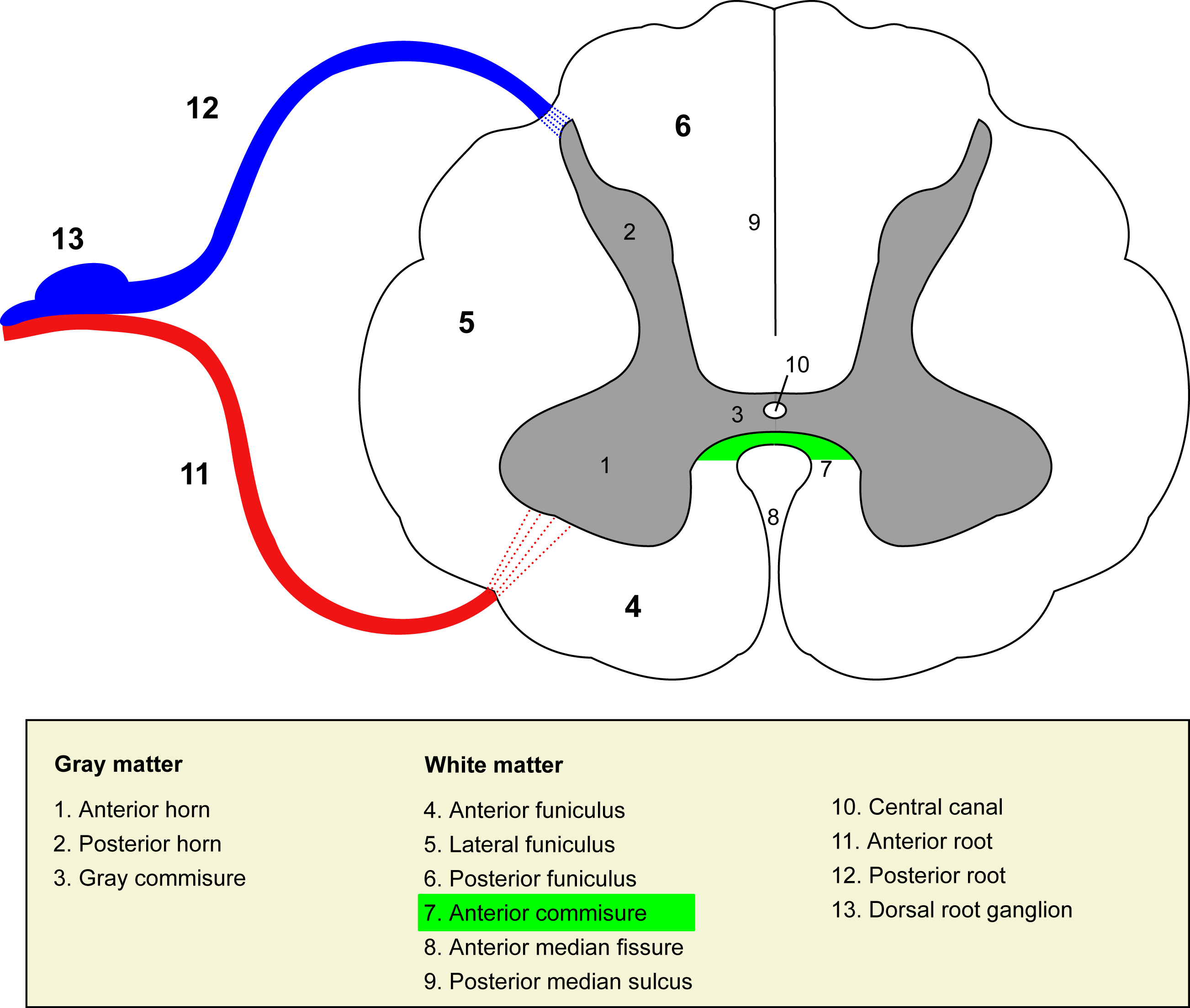
- The white commissure is highlighted in green.

Details

Identifiers
- Latin: commissura alba anterior medullae spinalis, alba anterior medullae spinalis
- TA98: A14.1.02.305
- TA2: 6125
- FMA: 77035

The anterior white commissure (ventral white commissure) is a bundle of nerve fibers which cross the midline of the spinal cord just anterior (in front of) to the gray commissure (Rexed lamina X). A delta fibers (Aδ fibers) and C fibers carrying pain sensation in the spinothalamic tract contribute to this commissure, as do fibers of the anterior corticospinal tract, which carry motor signals from the primary motor cortex.

Two of the five sensory modalities, pain and temperature, cross sides at the anterior white commissure, reaching the contralateral side about two vertebral levels rostral to their origin. The spinothalamic tract thus decussates very soon after entering the spinal cord, ascending in the spinal cord, contralateral to the side from where it provides (pain and temperature) sensory information. Therefore, a lesion that is caudal to the sensory decussation where the remaining three-fifths modalities decussate (at the superior medulla) will result in contralateral (opposite sided) pain and temperature loss (as this has already crossed over at the anterior white commissure), whereas loss of crude touch, pressure, and proprioception will be ipsilateral (same sided) as these have not yet crossed over.
