= Caudal pontine reticular nucleus =

Brainstem structure

Details

Identifiers
- Latin: nucleus reticularis pontis caudalis
- NeuroNames: 566
- NeuroLex ID: birnlex_792
- TA98: A14.1.05.502
- TA2: 5949
- FMA: 72469

The caudal pontine reticular nucleus or nucleus reticularis pontis caudalis is a portion of the reticular formation, composed of gigantocellular neurons.

In rabbits and cats it is exclusively giant cells, however in humans there are normally sized cells as well. In rodents, it has been shown to play a role in the acoustic startle response.

The caudal pontine reticular nucleus is rostral to the gigantocellular reticular nucleus and is located in the caudal pons.

The caudal pontine reticular nucleus has been known to mediate head movement, in concert with the gigantocellular nucleus and the superior colliculus.

The neurons in the dorsal half of this nucleus fire rhythmically during mastication, and in an anesthetized animal it is possible to induce mastication via electrical stimulation of the nucleus reticularis pontis caudalis or adjacent areas of the gigantocellular nucleus.

The caudal pontine reticular nucleus is also thought to play a role in the grinding of teeth during sleep. The region also suppresses muscle tone during REM sleep, activates eye movements, and decreases the sensory input to the cerebral cortex, specifically the primary and sensory somatosensory cortices.
