= Parvocellular reticular nucleus =

Neuron cluster of the medulla

Details

Identifiers
- Latin: nucleus reticularis parvocellaris
- NeuroNames: 728
- TA98: A14.1.04.312
- TA2: 6030
- FMA: 72575

The parvocellular reticular nucleus is part of the brain located dorsolateral to the caudal pontine reticular nucleus.

The dorsal portion of the reticular nucleus has been shown to innervate the mesencephalic trigeminal nucleus and its surrounding area.

Also, it projects to the facial nucleus, hypoglossal nucleus and parabrachial area along with parts of the caudal parvocellular reticular formation.

This nucleus is also involved in expiration with a part of the gigantocellular nucleus.
