= Nucleus proprius of spinal cord =

- Spinal cord - grey matter

Details

Identifiers
- Latin: nucleus proprius medullae spinalis; laminae spinales III et IV
- NeuroNames: 1633
- TA98: A14.1.02.121
- TA2: 6068
- FMA: 73906

The nucleus proprius of spinal cord is a layer of the spinal cord adjacent to the substantia gelatinosa. The nucleus proprius can be found in the gray matter in all levels of the spinal cord. It constitutes the first synapse of the posterior gray column carrying pain, temperature and crude touch sensations from peripheral nerves. Cells in this nucleus project to deeper laminae of the spinal cord, to the posterior column nuclei, and to other supraspinal relay centers including the midbrain, thalamus, and hypothalamus. Rexed laminae III and IV make up the nucleus proprius.

The neurons of the substantia gelatinosa of Rolando (Rexed lamina II) are involved in sensing pain and temperature.
