= Gigantocellular reticular nucleus =

Subregion of the medullary reticular formation

Details

Identifiers
- Latin: nucleus reticularis gigantocellularis
- NeuroNames: 730
- NeuroLex ID: nlx_anat_1005001
- TA98: A14.1.04.302
- TA2: 6028
- FMA: 72576

The gigantocellular reticular nucleus (also magnocellular reticular nucleus or nucleus reticularis gigantocellularis, where the acronym NRG arises from) is the (efferent/motor) medial zone of the reticular formation of the caudal pons and rostral medulla oblongata. It consists of a substantial number of giant neurons, but also contains small and medium sized neurons.

It gives rise to the lateral (medullary) reticulospinal tract which influences muscle tone of limb and trunk muscles, is involved in coordination of head-eye movements, promotes parasympathetic reduction of heart rate to decrease blood pressure, induces inspiration, and participates in the descending pain-inhibiting pathway.

== Anatomy ==
=== Afferents ===
It receives connections from the periaqueductal gray, the paraventricular hypothalamic nucleus, central nucleus of the amygdala, lateral hypothalamic area, and parvocellular reticular nucleus.

It receives afferent corticoreticular fibers from the premotor cortex and supplementary motor area which modulate the activity of reticulospinal and reticulobulbar efferents.

It receives vestibular, visual, and auditory afferents to mediate head-eye movement coordination.

It also receives inputs from the pedunculopontine nucleus.

It receives excitatory enkephalinergic afferents from the periaqueductal gray which influence its descending pain-inhibiting efferents.

== Function ==
=== Extrapyramidal motor functions ===
It gives rise to the lateral (medullary) reticulospinal tract (which excites flexors and inhibits extensors of the muscles of the axial and proximal limbs).

It is also involved in coordination of head-eye movements (receiving visual, vestibular, and auditory information to this end).

=== Blood pressure regulation ===
The NRG forms part of the vasodepressor center which projects through the reticulobulbar tract to synapse upon pre-ganglionic parasympathetic neurons of the nucleus of vagus nerve. It acts to decrease blood pressure by decreasing heart chronotropy (rate) by increasing vagal parasympathetic outflow to the heart.

=== Respiration ===
NRG induces inspiration (whereas the parvocellular nucleus causes expiration).

=== Descending pain-inhibiting pathway ===
The NRG - together with the nucleus raphe magnus (NRM) - gives rise to the descending serotonergic raphespinal tract which projects to the spinal cord to inhibit transmission of pain stimuli. The serotonergic analgesic component of the NRG receives excitatory enkephalinergic afferents from the periaqueductal gray.
