= Substantia gelatinosa of Rolando =

Region of the spinal cord involved in pain modulation

- Substantia gelatinosa of Rolando is Rexed lamina II, labeled at upper left.

Details

Identifiers
- Latin: substantia gelatinosa cornus posterioris medullae spinalis
- MeSH: D013376
- TA98: A14.1.02.119
- TA2: 6067
- FMA: 74019

Substantia gelatinosa of Rolando (SGR) (or gelatinous substance of the posterior horn), is a part of the spinal column. It forms the apex of the posterior grey column, one of three grey columns in the spinal cord. It is a v-shaped, translucent mass of neuroglia containing neuroglia cells and small neurons. Its gelatinous appearance derives from abundant neuropil with few myelinated fibers. It spans the entire spinal cord, extending into the medulla oblongata as the spinal trigeminal nucleus. Named after Luigi Rolando, it corresponds to Rexed lamina II.

== Structure ==
SGR, or lamina II, comprises outer and inner lamina II. In rodents, inner lamina II divides into dorsal and ventral sections, distinguished by their input and output projections. SGR contains islet, central, stalked (large vertical), small vertical, and radial cells. Islet and small vertical cells primarily release GABA, inhibiting subsequent neurons, while large vertical and radial cells release glutamate, triggering depolarization. Central cells release either GABA or glutamate. These cells form synapses that receive inputs from each other and primary afferent neurons, projecting to other lamina cells, creating complex excitatory and inhibitory circuits that transmit or suppress pain signals to the thalamus.

== Function ==
SGR, alongside the nucleus proprius, serves as a synapse point for first-order neurons of the spinothalamic tract. It hosts numerous μ and κ-opioid receptors, both presynaptic and postsynaptic that inhibit excitatory neurotransmitter release (e.g., substance P, glutamate) and hyperpolarize postsynaptic neurons to manage distal pain. Neuraxial opioid administration targets these receptors for analgesia.

C fibers, conveying slow, diffuse pain and temperature sensations, terminate in SGR. Some A delta fibers, carrying fast, localized pain, also synapse there, passing through to the nucleus proprius, enabling cross-talk between pain pathways. C fibers in outer lamina II and dorsal inner lamina II release glutamate to excite neurons, with some releasing BDNF, which may excite or inhibit based on postsynaptic neuron traits. These fibers contribute to central sensitization in chronic pain. Fibers releasing peptides like SST and GDNF may inhibit pain signaling.

SGR projects excitatory signals to the marginal nucleus (lamina I) and laminae III–V.
