= Rexed laminae =

Layers of grey matter in the spinal cord

Spinal cord - grey matter

Rexed laminae

The Rexed laminae (singular: Rexed lamina) comprise a system of ten layers of grey matter (I–X), identified in the early 1950s by Bror Rexed to label portions of the grey columns of the spinal cord.

Similar to Brodmann areas, they are defined by their cellular structure rather than by their location, but the location still remains reasonably consistent.

== Laminae ==
- Posterior grey column: I–VI
  - Lamina I: marginal nucleus of spinal cord or posteromarginal nucleus
  - Lamina II: substantia gelatinosa of Rolando
  - Laminae III and IV: nucleus proprius
  - Lamina V: Neck of the dorsal horn. Neurons within lamina V are mainly involved in processing sensory afferent stimuli from cutaneous, muscle and joint mechanical nociceptors as well as visceral nociceptors. This layer is home to wide dynamic range tract neurons, interneurons and propriospinal neurons. Viscerosomatic pain signal convergence often occurs in this lamina due to the presence of wide dynamic range tract neurons resulting in pain referral.
  - Lamina VI: Base of the dorsal horn. No nociceptive input occurs here, instead this lamina receives input from large-diameter fibres innervating muscles and joints and from muscle spindles which are sensitive to innocuous joint movement and muscle stretch to feed forward this information to the cerebellum where it can modulate muscle tone accordingly.
- Lateral grey column: VII and X
  - Lamina VII: intermediomedial nucleus, intermediolateral nucleus, posterior thoracic nucleus in the thoracic and upper lumbar region
  - Lamina X: an area of grey matter – the grey commissure surrounding the central canal. This region also serves to connect the anterior and posterior grey columns. Rexed never described this as lamina X but as area X.
- Anterior grey column: VIII–IX
  - Lamina VIII: motor interneurons
  - Lamina IX: hypaxial (body wall muscles), lateral (in limb regions) and medial (back muscles) motor neurons, also phrenic and spinal accessory nuclei at cervical levels, and Onuf's nucleus in the sacral region

== See also ==
- Terminal cisterna
- Preganglionic nerve fibers
- Postganglionic nerve fibers
- Splanchnic nerves
