= List of neuroscientists =

Many famous neuroscientists are from the 20th and 21st century, as neuroscience is a fairly new science. However many anatomists, physiologists, biologists, neurologists, psychiatrists and other physicians and psychologists are considered to be neuroscientists as well. This list compiles the names of all neuroscientists with a corresponding Wikipedia biographical article, and is not necessarily a reflection of their relative importance in the field.

Name	Lifetime	Nationality	Awards or eponymous
Larry Abbott	1950–	United States	Mathematical Neuroscience Prize - 2013.
Susan Ackerman		United States	
Albert Wojciech Adamkiewicz	1850–1921	Poland	Artery of Adamkiewicz
Edgar Douglas Adrian	1889–1977	United Kingdom	Nobel Prize in Physiology or Medicine - 1932.
Patrick Aebischer	1954–	Switzerland	
George Aghajanian	1932–2023	Lebanon	
Huda Akil	1945–	Syria	
A. Kimberley McAllister	1966–	United States	
Adria LeBoeuf	b.1982	United States	
Alcmaeon of Croton	c.510 BCE	Italy	
Giovanni Aldini	1762–1834	Italy	
Richard W. Aldrich		United States	
John Allman	1943–	United States	
Alois Alzheimer	1864–1915	Germany	Alzheimer's disease
David Amaral	1950–	United States	
Katrin Amunts	1962–	Germany	
Per Andersen	1930–2020	Norway	
Richard A. Andersen	1950–	United States	
David J. Anderson	1956–	United States	
Dora E. Angelaki		Greece	
Pyotr Anokhin	1898–1974	Russia	
Julius Caesar Aranzi	1529/1530–1589	Italy	
Silvia Arber	1968–	Switzerland	W. Alden Spencer Award-2018
Clay Armstrong	1934–	United States	
Friedrich Arnold	1803–1890	Germany	Arnold's nerve
Harden Askenasy	1908–1975	Israel	
Leopold Auerbach	1828–1897	Germany	Auerbach's plexus
Richard Axel	1946–	United States	Nobel Prize in Physiology or Medicine - 2004.
Julius Axelrod	1912–2004	United States	Nobel Prize in Physiology or Medicine - 1970.
Paul Bach-y-Rita	1934–2006	United States	
Herman S. Bachelard	1929–2006	United Kingdom	
Jules Baillarger	1809–1890	France	Bands of Baillarger
Róbert Bárány	1876–1936	Austria-Hungary	Nobel Prize in Physiology or Medicine - 1914.
Cornelia Bargmann	1961–	United States	Kavli prize in Neuroscience - 2012., Breakthrough Prize in Life Sciences - 2013.
Ben Barres	1954–2017	United States	Ralph W. Gerard Prize in Neuroscience-2016
Jessica Barson	fl.2000-2020	United States	
Danielle Bassett	1981–	United States	
Adolf Beck	1863–1942	Poland	
Georg von Békésy	1899–1972	Hungary	Nobel Prize in Physiology or Medicine - 1961.
Natalia Bekhtereva	1924-2008	Russia	
Vladimir Bekhterev	1857–1927	Russia	Bekhterev's nucleus, Bekhterev–Mendel reflex
Sir Charles Bell	1774–1842	United Kingdom	Bell's palsy, Bell's phenomenon, Bell–Magendie law
Alim Louis Benabid	1942–	France	Breakthrough Prize in Life Sciences - 2015.
April A. Benasich			
C. Frank Bennett		United States	Breakthrough Prize in Life Sciences - 2019
Seymour Benzer	1921–2007	United States	
Heather A. Berlin		United States	
Julius Bernstein	1839–1917	Germany	Bernstein Network
Vladimir Betz	1834–1894	Ukrainian	Betz cell
Albert von Bezold	1836–1868	Germany	Bezold–Jarisch reflex
Mayim Bialik	1975–	United States	
Elisabeth Binder	1971–	Austria	
Emilio Bizzi	1933–	Italy	
Timothy Bliss	1940–	United Kingdom	The Brain Prize - 2016.
Ned Block	1942–	United States	
Hal Blumenfeld	1962–	United States	
Herman Boerhaave	1668–1738	Netherlands	
Nancy Bonini	1959–	United States	
Azad Bonni	1963–	Canada - United States	
Daniel Bovet	1907–1992	Switzerland	Nobel Prize in Physiology or Medicine - 1957.
Edward Boyden	1979–	United States	Breakthrough Prize in Life Sciences - 2016., The Brain Prize - 2013.
Heiko Braak	1937–	Germany	Braak staging
Joseph V. Brady	1922–2011	United States	
Josef Breuer	1842–1925	Austria	Hering–Breuer reflex
Paul Broca	1824–1880	France	Broca's area, Broca's aphasia
Alf Brodal	1910–1988	Norway	
Korbinian Brodmann	1868–1918	Germany	Brodmann area
Michaela Brohm-Badry	1962–	Germany	
Thomas Graham Brown	1882–1965	United Kingdom	
Charles-Édouard Brown-Séquard	1817–1894	Mauritian	Brown-Séquard syndrome
Nathaniel A. Buchwald	1924–2006	United States	
Linda B. Buck	1947–	United States	Nobel Prize in Physiology or Medicine - 2004.
Paul Bucy	1904–1992	United States	Klüver–Bucy syndrome
Ludwig Julius Budge	1811–1888	Germany	Budge's center
György Buzsáki	1949–	Hungary	The Brain Prize - 2011. Ralph W. Gerard Prize in Neuroscience-2020
John T. Cacioppo	1951–2018	United States	
Leopoldo Caldani	1725–1813	Italy	
Donald Calne	1936–	Canada	
Matteo Carandini	1967–	Italy - United States	
Arvid Carlsson	1923–2018	Sweden	Nobel Prize in Physiology or Medicine - 2000.
Gail Carpenter	1948-	United States	First woman to receive the IEEE Neural Networks Pioneer Award for the development of adaptive resonance theory (ART) family of neural networks.
Ben Carson	1951–	United States	
C. Sue Carter	1944–	United States	
Richard Caton	1842–1926	United Kingdom	
Ugo Cerletti	1877–1963	Italy	
Carlos Chagas Filho	1910–2000	Brazil	
Jean-Pierre Changeux	1936–	France	
Jean-Martin Charcot	1825–1893	France	Charcot–Marie–Tooth disease, Charcot–Wilbrand syndrome, Charcot–Bouchard aneurysms, Charcot's triad
Cécile Charrier	1983–	France	Irène Joliot-Curie “Young Female Scientist of the Year” award
Alon Chen	1970–	Israel	11th President of the Weizmann Institute of Science
Daniel Choquet	1962–	France	
Jacob Augustus Lockhart Clarke	1817–1880	United Kingdom	nucleus dorsalis of Clarke
Don W. Cleveland	1950–	United States	Breakthrough Prize in Life Sciences - 2018.
Stanley Cohen	1922–2020	United States	Nobel Prize in Physiology or Medicine - 1986.
Graham Collingridge	1955–	United Kingdom	The Brain Prize - 2016.
Ed Connor	1955–	United States	
Alexander Cools	1941–2013	Netherlands	
Jules Cotard	1840–1889	France	Cotard delusion
Rodney Cotterill	1933–2007	United Kingdom	
S. Allen Counter	1944–2017	United States	
Miguel Rolando Covian	1913–1992	Argentina - Brazil	
Hans Gerhard Creutzfeldt	1885–1964	Germany	Creutzfeldt–Jakob disease
Francis Crick	1916–2004	United Kingdom	
Wim Crusio	1954–	Netherlands	
Harvey Cushing	1869–1939	United States	Cushing reflex, Cushing's disease
Johann Nepomuk Czermak	1828–1873	Austria - Germany	Czermak–Hering test
Annica Dahlström	1941–	Sweden	
Henry Hallett Dale	1875–1968	United Kingdom	Nobel Prize in Physiology or Medicine - 1936., Dale's principle
John Call Dalton	1825–1889	United States	
Antonio Damasio	1944–	Portugal - United States	Golden Brain Award - 1995.
Liverij Osipovich Darkshevich	1858–1925	Russia	Nucleus of Darkshevich
Richard Davidson	1951–	United States	
Peter Dayan	1965–	United Kingdom	The Brain Prize - 2017.
Duchenne de Boulogne	1806–1875	France	Duchenne Muscular Dystrophy, Duchenne-Aran spinal muscular atrophy, Duchenne-Erb paralysis
Yves De Koninck	1964–	United States	
Bart De Strooper	1960–	Belgium	The Brain Prize - 2018.
Jean Decety	1960–	France - United States	
Kay de Villiers	1928–2018	South Africa	Honorary President of the World Federation of Neurosurgical Societies.
Stanislas Dehaene	1965–	France	The Brain Prize - 2014.
Karl Deisseroth	1971–	United States	Breakthrough Prize in Life Sciences - 2016., The Brain Prize - 2013., Golden Brain Award - 2009.
Otto Deiters	1834–1863	Germany	
Augusta Déjerine-Klumpke	1859–1927	United States - France	Klumpke paralysis
Mahlon DeLong	1938–	United States	Breakthrough Prize in Life Sciences - 2014.
Winfried Denk	1957–	United States	Kavli prize in Neuroscience - 2012., The Brain Prize - 2015.
Christine Ann Denny		United States	
René Descartes	1596–1650	France	
Robert Desimone	1952–		Golden Brain Award - 1994. Ralph W. Gerard Prize in Neuroscience-2021
Richard Deth	1945–		
Adele Diamond	1952–	United States	
Marian Diamond	1926–2017	United States	
Elva Díaz	1970–	United States	Helen Hay Whitney Fellowship - 1999; Alfred P. Sloan Research Fellowship - 2004; National Institutes of Health Director's New Innovator Award - 2009; ADVANCE Scholar Award - 2023
Alexandre Dogiel	1852–1922	Lithuania	Dogiel cells
Merlin Donald	1939–	Canada	
Gerry Downes		United States	
Emil du Bois-Reymond	1818–1896	Germany	
Yadin Dudai	1944–	Israel	
Catherine Dulac	1963–	France	Ralph W. Gerard Prize in Neuroscience-2019
Lillian Dyck	1945–	Canada	
David Eagleman	1971–	United States	
John Carew Eccles	1903–1997	Australia	Nobel Prize in Physiology or Medicine - 1963.
Constantin von Economo	1876–1931	Austria	von Economo neurons
Gerald Edelman	1929–2014	United States	
Ludwig Edinger	1855–1918	Germany	Edinger–Westphal nucleus
Howard Eichenbaum	1947–2017	United States	
George Bard Ermentrout	1954–	United States	Mathematical Neuroscience Prize - 2015.
Andreas K. Engel	1961–	Germany	
Roger M. Enoka	1949–	New Zealand	
Erasistratus	c.304–c.250 BCE	Greece	
Joseph Erlanger	1874–1965	United States	Nobel Prize in Physiology or Medicine - 1944.
Ulf von Euler	1905–1983	Sweden	Nobel Prize in Physiology or Medicine - 1970.
Bartolomeo Eustachi	1500/1514–1574	Italy	Eustachian tube
Edward Evarts	1926–1985	United States	
Bengt Falck	1927–2023	Sweden	Falck-Hillarp method of fluorescence
James Fallon	1947–	United States	
Gabriele Falloppio	1523–1562	Italy	Aquæductus Fallopii
Paul Fatt	1924–2014	United Kingdom	
Richard Faull	1945–	New Zealand	
Gustav Fechner	1801–1887	Germany	Weber–Fechner law
Michale Fee	1964–	United States	
Eva Feldman		United States	
Guoping Feng		China	
Jean Fernel	1497–1558	France	
David Ferrier	1843–1928	United Kingdom	
Robert Fettiplace	1946–	United Kingdom	Kavli prize in Neuroscience - 2018.
Edward Flatau	1868–1932	Poland	
Paul Flechsig	1847–1929	Germany	Flechig-Meyer's loop, Flechsig's fasciculus
Ernst von Fleischl-Marxow	1846–1891	Austria	
Jean Pierre Flourens	1794–1867	France	
Otfrid Foerster	1873–1941	Germany	
Auguste-Henri Forel	1848–1931	Switzerland	Fields of Forel
Walter Jackson Freeman III	1927–2016	United States	
Allan H. Frey	1935–		
Karl J. Friston	1959–	United Kingdom	Golden Brain Award - 2003.
Chris Frith	1942–	United Kingdom	
Gennosuke Fuse	1880–1946	Japan	Kölliker-Fuse nucleus
Joaquin Fuster	1930–	Spain	
Fred "Rusty" Gage	1950–		
Joyonna Gamble-George		United States	
Robert Galambos	1914–2010	United States	
Galen	129–c. 200/c. 216	Greek	Vein of Galen
Franz Joseph Gall	1758–1828	Germany	
Michela Gallagher		United States	Leads the Neurogenetics and Behavior Center at Johns Hopkins University.
Luigi Galvani	1737–1798	Italy	Galvanism, Galvanic skin response, Galvanic vestibular stimulation
William Francis Ganong, Jr.	1924–2007	United States	
María Cristina García-Sancho	1919–2013	Mexico	First Latin American female neurosurgeon who created the García-Sancho One-step Bilateral Cordotomy
Herbert Spencer Gasser	1888–1963	United States	Nobel Prize in Physiology or Medicine - 1944. Gasser's ganglion
Henri Gastaut	1915–1995	France	Lennox–Gastaut syndrome, Idiopathic childhood occipital epilepsy of Gastaut
Michael Gazzaniga	1939–	United States	
Francesco Gennari	1750–1797	Italy	Line of Gennari
Ralph W. Gerard	1900–1974	United States	
Robert Gerlai	1960–	Hungary	
Anirvan Ghosh	1964–	United States	
Alfred G. Gilman	1941–2015	United States	Nobel Prize in Physiology or Medicine - 1994.
Donald A. Glaser	1926–2013	United States	
Francis Glisson	1599–1677	United Kingdom	
Michel Goedert	1954–	Luxembourg - United Kingdom	The Brain Prize - 2018.
David E. Goldman	1910–1998	United States	Goldman equation, GHK flux equation
Camillo Golgi	1843–1926	Italy	Nobel Prize in Physiology or Medicine - 1906. Golgi tendon organ, Golgi's method, Golgi cell, Golgi I, Golgi II
Justo Gonzalo	1910–1986	Spain	
Elizabeth Gould	1962–	United States	
Ragnar Granit	1900–1991	Finland	Nobel Prize in Physiology or Medicine - 1967.
Ann Graybiel	1942–	United States	Kavli prize in Neuroscience - 2012.
Maria Grazia Spillantini	1957–	Italy	
Michael E. Greenberg	1954–	United States	Ralph W. Gerard Prize in Neuroscience -2019
Susan Greenfield	1950–	United Kingdom	
Paul Greengard	1925–2019	United States	Nobel Prize in Physiology or Medicine - 2000.
Kalanit Grill-Spector		United States	
Sten Grillner	1941–	Sweden	Kavli prize in Neuroscience - 2008.
Bernhard von Gudden	1824–1886	Germany	commissure of Gudden, Mammillo-tegmental bundle of Gudden
Roger Guillemin	1924–2024	France	Nobel Prize in Physiology or Medicine - 1977.
Christian Haass	1960–	Germany	The Brain Prize - 2018.
Vladimir Hachinski	1941–	Ukrainian	
Marshall Hall	1790–1857	United Kingdom	
Albrecht von Haller	1708–1777	Switzerland	Hallerian physiology
Sam Harris	1967–	United States	
Haldan Keffer Hartline	1903–1983	United States	Nobel Prize in Physiology or Medicine - 1967.
Jeffrey C. Hall	1945–	United States	Nobel Prize in Physiology or Medicine - 2017.
John Hardy	1954–		Breakthrough Prize in Life Sciences - 2016. The Brain Prize - 2018.
Demis Hassabis	1976–	United Kingdom	
Michael Hasselmo	1962-	United States	
Rolf Hassler	1914–1984	Germany	
Donald Olding Hebb	1904–1985	Canada	Hebbian theory
Peter Hegemann	1954–	Germany	The Brain Prize - 2013.
Lennart Heimer	1930–2007	Switzerland	
Martin Heisenberg	1940–	Germany	
Hermann von Helmholtz	1821–1894	Germany	Helmholtz–Kohlrausch effect
Suzana Herculano-Houzel	1972–	Brazil	
Ewald Hering	1834–1918	Germany	Hering–Hillebrand deviation, Hering's law of visual direction, Hering's law of equal innervation, Hering–Breuer reflex
Herophilos	c.335–c.280 BCE	Greece	
Percy Herring	1872–1967	United Kingdom	Herring bodies
Richard L. Heschl	1824–1881	Austria	Heschl's gyrus
Walter Rudolf Hess	1881–1973	Switzerland	Nobel Prize in Physiology or Medicine - 1949.
Corneille Heymans	1892–1968	Belgium	Nobel Prize in Physiology or Medicine - 1938.
Okihide Hikosaka	1948–	Japan	Golden Brain Award - 2015
Nils-Åke Hillarp	1916–1965	Sweden	Falck-Hillarp method of fluorescence
Alan Lloyd Hodgkin	1914–1998	United Kingdom	Nobel Prize in Physiology or Medicine - 1963. Hodgkin–Huxley model, GHK flux equation, Hodgkin cycle
Oleh Hornykiewicz	1926–2020	Austria	
Victor Horsley	1857–1916	United Kingdom	
David H. Hubel	1926–2013	Canada	Nobel Prize in Physiology or Medicine - 1981.
A. James Hudspeth	1945–	United States	Kavli prize in Neuroscience - 2018.
John Hughes	1942–	United Kingdom	
Andrew Huxley	1917–2012	United Kingdom	Nobel Prize in Physiology or Medicine - 1963. Hodgkin–Huxley model
Laurent Itti	1970–	France	
Chingis Izmailov	1944-2011	Russia	
Ivan Izquierdo	1937–2021	Argentina - Brazil	
Louis Jacobsohn-Lask	1863–1941	Germany	Bekhterev–Jacobsohn reflex
John Hughlings Jackson	1835–1911	United Kingdom	Jacksonian seizure
Herbert Jasper	1906–1999	Canada	
Marc Jeannerod	1935–2011	France	
Thomas Jessell	1951–2019	United Kingdom	Kavli prize in Neuroscience - 2008. Ralph W. Gerard Prize in Neuroscience-2016
Amishi Jha		1970–	
Ted Jones	1939–2011	New Zealand	
Michel Jouvet	1925–2017	France	
Béla Julesz	1928–2003	Hungary	
David Julius	1955–	United States	Nobel Prize in Physiology or Medicine - 2021. Breakthrough Prize in Life Sciences - 2019.
Marcel Just			
Jon Kaas	1937–		Ralph W. Gerard Prize in Neuroscience-2021
Eric R. Kandel	1929–	Austria - United States	Nobel Prize in Physiology or Medicine - 2000.
Nancy Kanwisher	1958–	United States	Golden Brain Award - 2007.
George Karpati	1934–2009	Canada	
Bernard Katz	1911–2003	Germany	Nobel Prize in Physiology or Medicine - 1970., GHK flux equation
Lawrence C. Katz	1956–2005	United States	
Ryuta Kawashima	1959–	Japan	
JacSue Kehoe	1935–2019	United States	
J. A. Scott Kelso	1947–	Ireland	
James S. Ketchum	1931–2020	United States	
Seymour S. Kety	1915–2000	United States	
Heinrich Klüver	1897–1979	United States	Klüver–Bucy syndrome
Christof Koch	1956–	Germany - United States	
Albert von Kölliker	1817–1905	Switzerland	Kölliker-Fuse nucleus
Masakazu Konishi	1933–2020	Japan	
Jerzy Konorski	1903–1973	Poland	
George Koob	1947–		
Nancy Kopell	1942–	United States	Mathematical Neuroscience Prize - 2015.
Georg N. Koskinas	1885–1975	Greece	
Stanislav Kozlovsky	1976-	Russia	
Emil Kraepelin	1856–1926	Germany	Kraepelinian dichotomy
Christian Gottlieb Kratzenstein	1723–1795	Germany	
Edward Kravitz	1932–2025	United States	
Stephen Kuffler	1913–1980	Hungary	
Story Landis		United States	Ralph W. Gerard Prize in Neuroscience-2015
John Newport Langley	1852–1925	United Kingdom	
Louis Lapicque	1866–1952	France	
Marcelle Lapicque	1873–1962	France	
Steven Laureys	1968–	Belgium	
Denis Le Bihan	1957–	France	
Aristides Leão	1914–1993	Brazil	Leão's spreading depression
Joseph LeDoux	1949–	United States	
César Julien Jean Legallois	1770–1814	France	
Lars Leksell	1907–1986	Sweden	
Jerome Lettvin	1920–2011	United States	
Simon LeVay	1943–	United Kingdom - United States	
Rita Levi-Montalcini	1909–2012	Italy	Nobel Prize in Physiology or Medicine - 1986.
Daniel Levitin	1957–	United States - Canada	
Marc Lewis	1951–	Canada	
John C. Lilly	1915–2001	United States	
Charles Limb		United States	
Christiane Linster	1962–	Luxembourg	
Heinrich Lissauer	1861–1891	Poland	Lissauer's tract
Rodolfo Llinás	1934–	Colombia - United States	Llinás' law, Ralph W. Gerard Prize in Neuroscience-2018
Otto Loewi	1873–1961	Germany	Nobel Prize in Physiology or Medicine - 1936.
Nikos Logothetis	1950–	Greece	Golden Brain Award - 1999.
Terje Lømo	1935–	Norway	
Rafael Lorente de Nó	1902–1990	Spain	
Paul Loye	1861–1890	France	
Liliana Lubinska	1904–1990	Poland	
Keith Lucas	1879–1916	United Kingdom	
Liqun Luo	1966–	China	
Jules Bernard Luys	1828–1897	France	Luys' body
William Macewen	1848–1924	United Kingdom	
Roderick MacKinnon	1956–	United States	Nobel Prize in Chemistry - 2003.
François Magendie	1783–1855	France	Foramen of Magendie
Horace Winchell Magoun	1907–1991		
Eleanor Maguire	1970–2025	Ireland	
Misha Mahowald	1963–1996	United States	
Paolo Mantegazza	1831–1910	Italy	
Eve Marder	1948–	United States	Kavli prize in Neuroscience - 2016.
Henry Markram	1962-	South Africa	
Bianca Jones Marlin	living in 2020	United States	2017 Stat Wunderkinds Award
David Marr	1945–1980	United Kingdom	
C. David Marsden	1938–1998	United Kingdom	
Eliezer Masliah	1959-		
Niccolò Massa	1485–1569	Italy	
Carlo Matteucci	1811–1868	Italy	
Humberto Maturana	1928–2021	Chile	
Herbert Mayo	1796–1852	United Kingdom	
Mervyn Maze		South Africa	
James McClelland	1948–	United States	
James V. McConnell	1925–1990	United States	
Warren McCulloch	1898–1969	United States	McCulloch–Pitts neuron
Bruce McEwen	1938–2020	United States	
James McGaugh	1931–	United States	
Ladislas J. Meduna	1896–1964	Hungary	
H. Houston Merritt	1902–1979	United States	
Michael Merzenich	1942–	United States	Kavli prize in Neuroscience - 2016.
Franz Mesmer	1734–1815	Germany	Mesmerism
Adolf Meyer	1866–1950	Switzerland	Meyer's loop
Theodor Meynert	1833–1892	Germany	Nucleus basalis of Meynert, substantia innominata of Meynert
Gero Miesenböck	1965–	Austria	The Brain Prize - 2013.
Earl K. Miller	1962–	United States	Goldman-Rakic Prize for Outstanding Achievement in Cognitive Neuroscience - 2016 George A. Miller Prize in Cognitive Neuroscience - 2019
Brenda Milner	1918–	United Kingdom - Canada	Kavli prize in Neuroscience - 2014.
Peter Milner	1919–2018	United Kingdom - Canada	
Mondino de Luzzi	1270–1326	Italy	
Egas Moniz	1874–1955	Portugal	Nobel Prize in Physiology or Medicine - 1949., Moniz sign
Alexander Monro	1733–1817	United Kingdom	Foramina of Monro
Read Montague	1960–	United States	
Richard G. Morris	1948–	United Kingdom	The Brain Prize - 2016.
Giuseppe Moruzzi	1910–1986	Italy	
Edvard Moser	1962–	Norway	Nobel Prize in Physiology or Medicine - 2014.
May-Britt Moser	1963–	Norway	Nobel Prize in Physiology or Medicine - 2014.
Vernon Mountcastle	1918–2015	United States	
Anthony Movshon	1950–	United States	Golden Brain Award - 2013.
Heinrich Müller	1820–1864	Germany	Muller glia
Johannes Peter Müller	1801–1858	Germany	
Ken Nakayama		United States	Golden Brain Award - 2017.
Jeremy Nathans	1958–	United States	Golden Brain Award - 1989.
Walle Nauta	1916–1994	Dutch East Indies	
Erwin Neher	1944–	Germany	Nobel Prize in Physiology or Medicine - 1991.
Charles A. Nelson III	1953–	United States	
Helen Neville	1946–2018	Canada	
William Newsome	1952–	United States	Golden Brain Award - 1992.
John Graham Nicholls	1929–2023	United Kingdom - Switzerland	
Miguel Nicolelis	1961–	Brazil	
Rudolf Nieuwenhuys	1927–2024	Netherlands	
Franz Nissl	1860–1919	Germany	Nissl body, Nissl granules, Nissl method
Akinori Noma		Japan	
Fernando Nottebohm	1940–	Argentina	
John O'Keefe	1939–	United States - United Kingdom	Nobel Prize in Physiology or Medicine - 2014., Kavli prize in Neuroscience - 2014.
Heinrich Obersteiner	1847–1922	Austria	Redlich–Obersteiner's zone
Seiji Ogawa	1934–	Japan	
Melly Oitzl	1955–	Austria	
Bronislaw Onuf-Onufrowicz	1863–1928	Russia	Onuf's nucleus
Jaak Panksepp	1943–2017	Estonia - United States	
James Papez	1883–1958	United States	Papez circuit
Alvaro Pascual-Leone	1961–	Spain	
Ardem Patapoutian	1967–	Lebanon	Nobel Prize in Physiology or Medicine - 2021.
Paul Patterson	1943–2014	United States	
Steven M. Paul	1950–	United States	
Ivan Pavlov	1849–1936	Russia	Nobel Prize in Physiology or Medicine - 1904. Pavlovian conditioning
George Paxinos	1944–	Greece	
Wilder Penfield	1891–1976	United States - Canada	Penfield's maps
Edward Perl	1926–2014	United States	
David Perrett	1954–		Golden Brain Award - 2001.
Candace Pert	1946–2013	United States	
Christine Petit	1948–	France	Kavli prize in Neuroscience - 2018. The Brain Prize - 2012.
Eduard Pflüger	1829–1910	Germany	
Archangelo Piccolomini	1525-1586	Italy	
Walter Pitts	1923–1969	United States	McCulloch–Pitts neuron
Tomaso Poggio	1947–	Italy	
Vladimir Pravdich-Neminsky	1879–1952	Russia	
Karl Pribram	1919–2015	Austria	
Stanley B. Prusiner	1942–	United States	Nobel Prize in Physiology or Medicine - 1997.
Jan Evangelista Purkyně	1787–1869	Czech Republic	Purkinje effect, Purkinje cell, Purkinje fibre, Purkinje images
Dale Purves	1938–	United States	
Marcus Raichle	1937–	United States	Kavli prize in Neuroscience - 2014.
Pasko Rakic	1933–	Kingdom of Yugoslavia - United States	Kavli prize in Neuroscience - 2008.
Patricia Goldman Rakic	1937–2003	United States	
Wilfrid Rall	1922–2018	United States	
Vilayanur S. Ramachandran	1951–	India - United States	
Santiago Ramón y Cajal	1852–1934	Spain	Nobel Prize in Physiology or Medicine - 1906. Cajal–Retzius cell, Cajal body, Interstitial cell of Cajal
James B. Ranck Jr.	1930–	United States	
Louis-Antoine Ranvier	1835–1922	France	Node of Ranvier
Geraint Rees	1967–	United Kingdom	
Seymour Reichlin	1924–	United States	
Johann Christian Reil	1759–1813	Germany	Islands of Reil
Ernst Reissner	1824–1878	Germany	Reissner's membrane
Thomas Reh		United States	
Robert Remak	1815–1865	Poland - Germany	
Gustaf Retzius	1842–1919	Sweden	Cajal–Retzius cell
Bror Rexed	1914–2002	Sweden	Rexed laminae
David Rioch	1900–1985	India - United States	
Giacomo Rizzolatti	1937–	Italy	The Brain Prize - 2014.
Trevor Robbins	1949–	United Kingdom	The Brain Prize - 2014.
Nathalie L. Rochefort	about 1979	United Kingdom	Women in Neuroscience UK Leading Researcher: Cognition and Neurodevelopment – 2024
Gonzalo Rodríguez Lafora	1886–1971	Spain	Lafora disease and Lafora bodies
Luigi Rolando	1773–1831	Italy	Rolandic area, substantia gelatinosa of Rolando, Fissure of Rolando, Rolandic epilepsy
Edmund Rolls	1945–		
Michael Rosbash	1944–	United States	Nobel Prize in Physiology or Medicine - 2017.
Steven Rose	1938–	United Kingdom	
James Rothman	1950–	United States	Nobel Prize in Physiology or Medicine - 2013., Kavli prize in Neuroscience - 2010.
Bernardo Sabatini	1969-	United States	
Jane Rylett	1952–	Canada	
Renato M. E. Sabbatini	1947–	Brazil	
Oliver Sacks	1933–2015	United Kingdom	
Manfred Sakel	1900–1957	Austria	
Bert Sakmann	1942–	Germany	Nobel Prize in Physiology or Medicine - 1991.
Anders Sandberg	1972–	Sweden	
Robert Sapolsky	1957–	United States	
Antonio Scarpa	1752–1832	Italy	Scarpa's fluid, Foramina of Scarpa, Scarpa's ganglion
Károly Schaffer	1864–1939	Hungary	Schaffer collateral
Andrew Schally	1926–2024	France	Nobel Prize in Physiology or Medicine - 1977.
Richard Scheller	1953–	United States	Kavli prize in Neuroscience - 2010.
Daniela Schiller	1972–	Israel	
Francis O. Schmitt	1903–1995	United States	
Erich Schröger	1958–	Germany	
Theodor Schwann	1810–1882	Germany	Schwann cell
Eric L. Schwartz	1947–2018		
James H. Schwartz	1932–2006	United States	
Ivan Sechenov	1829-1905	Russia	Discovered inhibition in the central nervous system
Terrence J. Sejnowski	1947–	United States	
Sebastian Seung	1966–	Korea - United States	
Michael Shadlen	1959–	United States	Golden Brain Award - 2012.
Maryam M. Shanechi	1981–	Iran	one of the Science News 10 scientists to watch in 2019.
Tali Sharot		Israel	
Carla J. Shatz	1947–	United States	Kavli prize in Neuroscience - 2016. Ralph W. Gerard Prize in Neuroscience-2011
Gordon Shepherd	1933–2022		
Charles Scott Sherrington	1857–1952	United Kingdom	Nobel Prize in Physiology or Medicine - 1932. Sherrington's First Law, Sherrington's law of reciprocal innervation, Liddell-Sherrington reflex, Sherrington's First Law, Vulpian-Heidenhain-Sherrington phenomenon
Aafia Siddiqui	1972–	Pakistan	
James A. Simmons			
Eero Simoncelli		United States	Golden Brain Award - 2016.
Wolf Singer	1943–	Germany	
Ruxandra Sireteanu	1945–2008	Romania	Bielschowsky Society Award for Research in Strabismus - 1994.
Phil Skolnick	1947–	United States	
Jens Christian Skou	1918–2018	Denmark	Nobel Prize in Chemistry - 1997.
P. J. Snow	1948–	Australia	
Solomon H. Snyder	1938–	United States	
Eugene Sokolov	1920-2008	Russia	
Louis Sokoloff	1921–2015	United States	
Samuel Thomas von Sömmerring	1755–1830	Germany	
Peter Somogyi	1950–	Hungary	The Brain Prize - 2011.
Haim Sompolinsky	1949–	Denmark	Mathematical Neuroscience Prize - 2013.
Yvonne Sorrel-Dejerine	1891–1986	French	
Roger Wolcott Sperry	1913–1994	United States	Nobel Prize in Physiology or Medicine - 1981.
Larry Squire	1941–		
Karen Steel		United Kingdom	The Brain Prize - 2012.
Nicolas Steno	1638–1686	Denmark	
Mircea Steriade	1924–2006	Romania	
Lina Stern	1878–1968	Russia	
Charles F. Stevens	1934–2022	United States	W. Alden Spencer Award-1979
Thomas C. Südhof	1955–	Germany - United States	Nobel Prize in Physiology or Medicine - 2013., Kavli prize in Neuroscience - 2010.
Nobuo Suga	1933–	Japan	
Karel Svoboda	1965–	Czech Republic	The Brain Prize - 2015.
Jan Swammerdam	1637–1680	Netherlands	
Larry Swanson	1945–	United States	
Franciscus Sylvius	1614–1672	Netherlands	Sylvian fissure, Sylvian aqueduct
János Szentágothai	1912–1994	Hungary	
Joseph Takahashi	1951–	Japan - United States	
David W. Tank	1953–	United States	The Brain Prize - 2015.
Ichiji Tasaki	1910–2009	Japan - United States	
Jill Bolte Taylor	1959–	United States	
Sally Temple			
Johannes Thome	1967–		
Naftali Tishby	1952–2021	Israel	Mathematical Neuroscience Prize - 2019.
Susumu Tonegawa	1939–2026	Japan	
Giulio Tononi	1960–	Italy	
Anne Treisman	1935–2018	United Kingdom	Golden Brain Award - 1996.
Doris Tsao	1975–	United States	Golden Brain Award - 2014.
Richard W. Tsien	1945–	China - United States	Ralph W. Gerard Prize in Neuroscience-2014
Misha Tsodyks	1960–	Russia	Mathematical Neuroscience Prize - 2017.
Endel Tulving	1927–2023		
Fred W. Turek	1947–	United States	
Robert Turner	1946–	United Kingdom	
Lucina Uddin		Bangladesh	
Leslie Ungerleider	1946–2020		Golden Brain Award - 2011.
Elliott Valenstein	1923–2023	United States	
Antonio Maria Valsalva	1666–1723	Italy	Valsalva maneuver
Francisco Varela	1946–2001	Chile	
Costanzo Varolio	1543–1575	Italy	Pons Varolii
Andreas Vesalius	1514–1564	Habsburg Netherlands	
Jerzy Vetulani	1936-2017	Poland	Anna-Monika Prize - 1983.
Félix Vicq-d'Azyr	1748–1794	France	Bundle of Vicq d’Azyr
Arno Villringer	1958–	Germany	
Olga Vinogradova	1929-2001	Russia	
Marthe Vogt	1903–2003	Germany	
Joshua T. Vogelstein	1981–	United States	
Oskar Vogt	1870–1959	Germany	
Julius Wagner-Jauregg	1857–1940	Austria	
George Wald	1906–1997	United States	Nobel Prize in Physiology or Medicine - 1967.
Heinrich Wilhelm Gottfried von Waldeyer-Hartz	1836–1921	Germany	
Augustus Volney Waller	1816–1870	United Kingdom	Wallerian degeneration
William Grey Walter	1910–1977	United States - United Kingdom	
Shih-Chun Wang	1910–1993	United States	
Kevin Warwick	1954–	United Kingdom	
Ernst Heinrich Weber	1795–1878	Germany	Weber–Fechner law
Karl Wernicke	1848–1905	Germany	Wernicke's area, Wernicke's aphasia
Karl Friedrich Otto Westphal	1833–1890	Germany	Westphal's sign, Edinger–Westphal nucleus
Victor P. Whittaker	1919–2016	United Kingdom	
Robert Whytt	1714–1766	United Kingdom	
Torsten Wiesel	1924–	Sweden	Nobel Prize in Physiology or Medicine - 1981.
Nolan R. Williams	1982–2025	United States	
Samuel Williamson	1939–2005	United States	
Thomas Willis	1621–1675	United Kingdom	Circle of Willis
Moshe Wolman	1914–2009	Israel	
Valerie Wojna	–	United States	Fellow, American Academy of Neurology - 2001.
Daniel Wolpert	1963–	United Kingdom	Golden Brain Award - 2010.
Robert Wurtz	1936–	United States	Golden Brain Award - 1991.
Michael W. Young	1949–	United States	Nobel Prize in Physiology or Medicine - 2017.
E. Paul Zehr	1968–	Canada	
Semir Zeki	1940–	United Kingdom	Golden Brain Award - 1985.
Huda Zoghbi	1955–	Lebanon	Breakthrough Prize in Life Sciences - 2017.
Yngve Zotterman	1898–1982	Sweden	
Charles Zuker	1957–	Chile	
George Zweig	1937–	Russia - United States	

== See also ==
- History of neuroscience
- List of cognitive neuroscientists
- List of neurologists and neurosurgeons
- List of women neuroscientists
