= Onuf =

Onuf is a surname. Notable people with the surname include:

- Bronislaw Onuf-Onufrowicz (1863–1928), Russian-born American neurologist
- Nicholas Onuf (born 1941), American international relations scholar
- Peter S. Onuf, American historian and professor

== See also ==
- Onuf's nucleus
