= Christian Friedrich Wilhelm Roller =

German psychiatrist

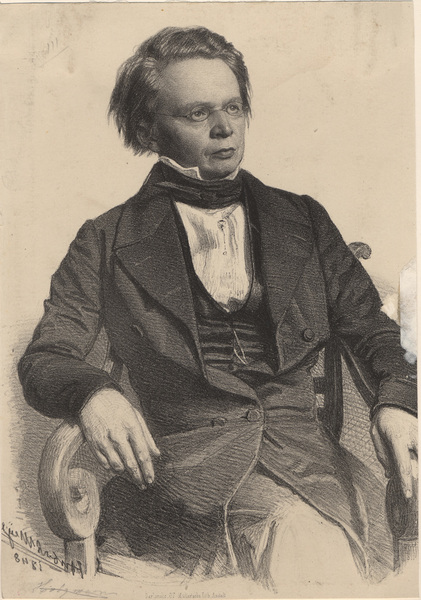
Christian Friedrich Wilhelm Roller

Christian Friedrich Wilhelm Roller (11 January 1802 – 3 January 1878) was a German psychiatrist born in Pforzheim.

== Career ==
Roller studied medicine at the Universities of Tübingen and Göttingen, and following graduation returned to Pforzheim to practice medicine. In 1827 he became an assistant at a mental institution in Heidelberg, and from 1835 to 1842 was director of the asylum.

At the Heidelberg asylum he was distressed by the conditions he experienced, and in collaboration with physician Friedrich Groos (1768-1852), he developed plans for construction of a larger, more modern facility. Later his plans became reality when in 1842 he founded the Illenau Healing and Care Institution (Heil- und Pflegeanstalt Illenau) at Achern. Roller was director of the Illenau institution until his death in 1878.

As a psychiatrist Roller was vehemently opposed to "city asylums", a standpoint which placed him at odds with a number of his contemporaries. He believed that an isolated non-urban setting such as Illenau was beneficial for a patients' return to mental health. In addition, he stressed the importance of separating the patient from his/her familiar surroundings. Two of the better known psychiatrists who served under him at Illenau were Bernhard von Gudden (1824-1886) and Richard von Krafft-Ebing (1840-1902).

== Selected publications ==
- Die Irrenanstalt nach allen ihren Beziehungen dargestellt, 1831.
- Psychiatrische Zeitfragen aus dem Gebiet der Irrenfürsorge in und außer den Anstalten und ihren Beziehungen zum staatlichen und gesellschaftlichen Leben, 1874.
