= Ruchika Prakash =

American psychologist

Ruchika Shaurya Prakash
- Born: India
- Education: University of Illinois at Urbana-Champaign; Delhi University
- Scientific career
- Workplaces: Ohio State University
- Thesis: Cortical recruitment in Multiple Sclerosis : an fMRI investigation of individual differences (2009)
- Website: Clinical Neuroscience Lab

Ruchika Shaurya Prakash is an American psychologist who is a professor at Ohio State University. She is Director of the Center for Cognitive and Behavioral Brain Imaging. Prakash was awarded the American Psychological Association Early Career Achievement Award in 2016. She delivered online webinars on resilience and mindfulness throughout the COVID-19 pandemic.

== Early life and education ==
Prakash was born in India and attended Delhi University, where her parents were both lecturers. Prakash completed a bachelor's and master's degree in psychology. She moved to the United States to gain training in neuroscience, and joined the University of Illinois Urbana-Champaign. Her doctoral research made use of functional magnetic resonance imaging to better understand multiple sclerosis. In particular, Prakash considered relapsing remitting MS, which she showed causes considerable cognitive impairments in memory and learning. She showed that high levels of aerobic fitness can preserve grey matter and fractional anisotropy in white matter tracts. Alongside her doctoral research, Prakash showed that physical fitness was related to brain development in children.

== Research and career ==
Prakash continued to study neuroplasticity and neurological disorders. She is interested in understanding the similarities and differences between cognitive dysfunction in ageing and multiple sclerosis. Prakash has developed strategies that can help to reduce cognitive decline, including fitness and wellbeing-based interventions.

Prakash demonstrated that mindfulness training and meditation can help people with multiple sclerosis process negative emotions and improve their processing speed. During the COVID-19 pandemic, Prakash delivered an online webinar on mindfulness and meditation.

== Awards and honors ==
- 2013 Association for Psychological Science Rising Star
- 2016 American Psychological Association Springer Early Career Achievement in Research on Adult Development and Aging Award

== Selected publications ==
- Kirk I Erickson; Michelle W Voss; Ruchika Shaurya Prakash; et al. (January 31, 2011). "Exercise training increases size of hippocampus and improves memory". Proceedings of the National Academy of Sciences of the United States of America. 108 (7): 3017–3022. Bibcode:2011PNAS..108.3017E. doi:10.1073/pnas.1015950108. ISSN 0027-8424. PMC 3041121. PMID 21282661. Wikidata Q24619698.
- Stanley J Colcombe; Kirk I Erickson; Paige E Scalf; et al. (November 1, 2006). "Aerobic exercise training increases brain volume in aging humans". The Journals of Gerontology. 61 (11): 1166–1170. doi:10.1093/gerona/61.11.1166. ISSN 1758-535X. PMID 17167157. Wikidata Q48338741.
- Laura Chaddock; Kirk I Erickson; Ruchika Shaurya Prakash; et al. (August 22, 2010). "A neuroimaging investigation of the association between aerobic fitness, hippocampal volume, and memory performance in preadolescent children". Brain Research. 1358: 172–183. doi:10.1016/j.brainres.2010.08.049. ISSN 0006-8993. PMC 3953557. PMID 20735996. Wikidata Q34132940.
- Kirk I Erickson; Ruchika S Prakash; Michelle W Voss; et al. (October 1, 2009). "Aerobic fitness is associated with hippocampal volume in elderly humans". Hippocampus. 19 (10): 1030–1039. doi:10.1002/hipo.20547. ISSN 1050-9631. PMC 3072565. PMID 19123237. Wikidata Q34771482.
