= Misha Tsodyks =

Russian neuroscientist and researcher

- Education: Moscow Institute of Physics and Technology, Landau Institute for Theoretical Physics
- Known for: Synaptic plasticity, Attractor neural networks, place-related activity in Hippocampus, population activity and functional architecture in the primary visual cortex
- Awards: Mathematical Neuroscience Prize; Morris L. Levinson Biology Prize
- Scientific career
- Fields: Theoretical Neuroscience
- Workplaces: Weizmann Institute of Science, Institute for Advanced Study

Misha Tsodyks (Hebrew: מישה צודיקס) is a leading theoretical and computational neuroscientist whose research focuses on identifying neural algorithms underlying cortical systems and cognitive behavior. His most notable achievements include demonstrating the importance of sparsity in neural networks, describing the mechanisms of short-term synaptic plasticity and working and associative memory.

As of 2019, Tsodyks is the C.V. Starr Professor at the Institute for Advanced Study in New Jersey. He also teaches at the Weizmann Institute of Science and serves as the Chief Editor of Frontiers of Computational Neuroscience.

Tsodyks has received numerous awards for his work in the field including the Mathematical Neuroscience Prize, the Morris L. Levinson Biology Prize, membership of the Society for Neuroscience, and membership of the editorial board of various scientific journals.

== Biography ==
Tsodyks received his Masters from the Moscow Institute of Physics and Technology in 1983 and his doctorate from the Landau Institute for Theoretical Physics. He went on to work as a research scientist at various high profile institutions, including the Institute of Higher Nervous Activity and Neurophysiology at the USSR Academy of Science in 1987, the Racah Institute of Physics at the Hebrew University of Jerusalem in 1990, the Howard Hughes Medical Institute and the Salk Institute for Biological Studies in 1994.

He eventually assumed a position as senior investigator at the Weizmann Institute of Science in 1995, which resulted in his becoming an associate professor in 2000, a full professor of theoretical and computational neuroscience in 2005, and a department head in 2006.

In addition to his work at the Weizmann Institute, Tsodyks served as an adjunct professor at Columbia University from 2010 to 2015, at which point he became a visiting professor. As of 2019, he is the C.V. Starr Professor of Theoretical Neuroscience at the Institute for Advanced Study.

Tsodyks has also assumed a number of influential positions at various scientific journals. He was a member of the editorial board of Neural Networks (journal) from 1999 to 2007, the Hippocampus (journal) from 1999 to 2003, and joined the editorial board of the Journal of Computational Neuroscience in 2000. He was named Chief Editor of Frontiers of Computational Neuroscience in 2007.

== Select publications ==
Misha Tsodyks has an extensive publication record. A selection of works is listed below:

- Naim, M.; Katkov, M.; Romani, S.; Tsodyks, M. (2020-01-10). "Fundamental law of memory recall". Physical Review Letters. 124 (1) 018101. arXiv:1905.02403. Bibcode:2020PhRvL.124a8101N. doi:10.1103/PhysRevLett.124.018101. PMID 31976719.
- Tsodyks, M.V.; Markram, H. (1997-01-21). "The neural code between neocortical pyramidal neurons depends on neurotransmitter release probability". Proceedings of the National Academy of Sciences. 94 (2): 719–723. Bibcode:1997PNAS...94..719T. doi:10.1073/pnas.94.2.719. PMC 19580. PMID 9012851.
- Markram, Henry; Wang, Yun; Tsodyks, Misha (1998-04-28). "Differential signaling via the same axon of neocortical pyramidal neurons". Proceedings of the National Academy of Sciences. 95 (9): 5323–8. Bibcode:1998PNAS...95.5323M. doi:10.1073/pnas.95.9.5323. PMC 20259. PMID 9560274.
- Tsodyks, M.V.; Kenet, T.; Grinvald, A.; Arieli, A. (1999-12-03). "Linking spontaneous activity of single cortical neurons and the underlying functional architecture". Science. 286 (5446): 1943–6. doi:10.1126/science.286.5446.1943. PMID 10583955.

== Bibliography ==
- Wu, Si; Wong, Michael K. Y.; Tsodyks, Misha (2015-01-08). Neural Information Processing with Dynamical Synapses. Frontiers. ISBN 978-2-88919-383-7.
- Brunel, Nicolas; Del Guidice, Paolo; Fusi, Stefano; Parisi, Giorgio; Tsodyks, Misha (2013). Selected Papers Of Daniel Amit. World Scientific. ISBN 978-981-4383-65-3.

== Notable honors ==
- Starr Foundation Grant.
- Mathematical Neuroscience Prize, Israel Brain Technologies.
- Morris L. Levinson Biology Prize.
- Member of the Editorial Boards of the Journal of Computational Neuroscience.
- Member of the Editorial Boards of Neural Networks (journal).
- Member of the Editorial Boards of Hippocampus (journal).
- Chief Editor, Frontiers of Computational Neuroscience
- Member of the Society for Neuroscience.
- Member of the Israeli Society for Neuroscience.
