= Schröger =

Schröger or Schroeger is a German surname. Notable people with the surname include:

- Erich Schröger (born 1958), German psychologist and neuroscientist
- Ephraim Schröger (1727–1783), German architect active in Poland
