= Thome =

Thomé and Thome are French or German variants of the name Thomas which now appears as a surname and in placenames.

== Places ==
- Saint-Thomé, commune in the Ardèche department, France
- São Thomé das Letras, city in Minas Gerais state, Brazil
- San Thome Basilica, Roman Catholic cathedral in Chennai (Madras), India
- Thome, ancient name of Ithome (Thessaly), in Greece

== People ==
- Thome Rodrigo (c. mid-1500s), Sri Lankan Sinhala Karava noble, signatory of the Convention of Malvana between the Kingdom of Portugal and the Kingdom of Kotte
- André Thome (1879-1916), French politician.
- Delfina Thome (born 1996), Argentine field hockey player
- Diane Thome (1942–2025), American composer
- Emerson Thome (born 1972), Brazilian former football player
- Francis Thomé (1850–1909), French pianist and composer
- Jim Thome (born 1970), Major League Baseball hitter
- Joel Thome, American conductor
- John M. Thome (1843–1908), American-Argentine astronomer
- Johannes Thome, European psychiatrist and scientist
- Otto Wilhelm Thomé (1840–1925), German botanist and botanical artist
- Rudolf Thome (born 1939), German film director and producer
- Verner Thomé (1878-1953), Finnish painter
- Xavier Noiret-Thomé (born 1971), French painter
