= Hubert von Grashey =

German psychiatrist

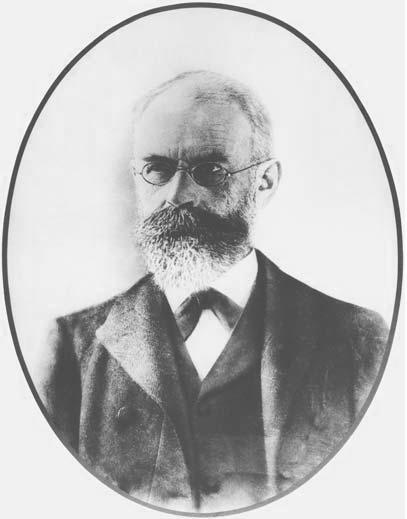
Hubert von Grashey (1839–1914)

Hubert von Grashey (30 October 1839 – 24 August 1914) was a German psychiatrist born in Grönenbach. He was son-in-law to psychiatrist Bernhard von Gudden (1824–1886).

He studied medicine at the Universities of Würzburg, Vienna and Berlin, earning his doctorate in 1867. Following graduation he worked under Gudden at the "Kreis-Irrenanstalt" (district mental asylum) in Werneck. Later he was appointed director of the Kreis-Irrenanstalt-Deggendorf, and in 1884 succeeded Franz von Rinecker (1811–1883) as director of the mental hospital at Würzburg.

After the death of his father-in-law in 1886, he relocated to Munich, becoming head of the Upper Bavarian Kreis-Irrenanstalt. In 1896 he replaced Joseph von Kerschensteiner (1831–1896) in the Ministry, subsequently becoming chief medical officer and chair of the Bavarian Obermedizinalausschuss.

Grashey died in Munich.

== Selected writings ==
- Die Wellenbewegung elastischer Röhren und der Arterienpuls des Menschen, Leipzig (1881).
- Bernhard von Gudden's gesammelte und hinterlassene abhandlungen, (1889) -- Collected works of Bernhard von Gudden.
