= Bernhard von Gudden =

German neuroanatomist and psychiatrist

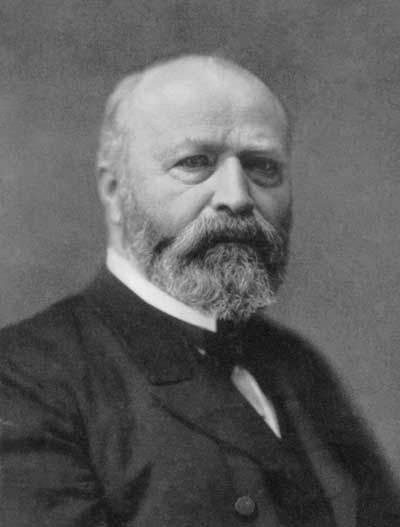
- Born: Bernhard von Gudden; 7 June 1824; Kleve, Rhine Province, Prussia
- Died: 13 June 1886 (aged 62); Lake Starnberg, Bavaria, German Empire

Johann Bernhard Aloys von Gudden (7 June 1824 – 13 June 1886) was a German neuroanatomist and psychiatrist born in Kleve.

== Career ==
In 1848, von Gudden earned his doctorate from the University of Halle and became an intern at the asylum in Siegburg under Carl Wigand Maximilian Jacobi (1775–1858). From 1851 to 1855 he worked as a psychiatrist under Christian Friedrich Wilhelm Roller (1802–1878) in the mental asylum at Illenau in Baden, then from 1855 to 1869, served as director of the mental institution (Unterfränkische Landes-Irrenanstalt) in Werneck. In 1869, he was appointed director of the Burghölzli Hospital, as well as professor of psychiatry at the University of Zurich. In 1872, he was appointed Obermedicinalrath and director of the Upper Bavarian Kreis-Irrenanstalt (district mental asylum), located in Munich. Shortly after, he became a professor of psychiatry at the Ludwig-Maximilians-Universität München.

Gudden made many contributions in the field of neuroanatomy, especially in his work of mapping and describing the paths, connections, origins/termini and neuroanatomical centers of cranial and optic nerve networks. The commissural fibers of the optic tract are called the commissure of Gudden in his honor, and he is credited for developing a specialized microtome for sectioning the brain for pathological study. Among his well-known students and assistants are Emil Kraepelin (1856–1926), Franz Nissl (1860–1919), Auguste-Henri Forel (1848–1931), Sigbert Josef Maria Ganser (1853–1931) and Oskar Panizza (1853–1921).

As director of mental institutions, Gudden advocated a no-restraint policy, humane treatment of the mentally ill, communal social interaction among patients, and a well-trained medical staff. These were considered innovative, if not revolutionary ideas concerning mental health treatment in the mid-19th century.

Gudden was a respected psychiatrist in Germany and was appointed personal physician to King Ludwig II of Bavaria.

== Death and legacy ==
On June 13, 1886, Ludwig and Gudden were both found dead in the water near the shore of Lake Starnberg at 11:30 p.m., allegedly drowned, possibly murdered. To this day the details of their deaths remain a mystery.

After Gudden's death, his works were collected and edited by his son-in-law, psychiatrist Hubert von Grashey (1839–1914), being published in 1889 with the title "Bernhard von Gudden’s gesammelte und hinterlassene Abhandlungen".

== Selected writings ==
- Beiträge zur Lehre von den Scabies (second edition in 1863) - Contributions to the theory of scabies
- Experimentaluntersuchungen über das peripherische und centrale Nervensystem. Archiv für Psychiatrie und Nervenkrankheiten, Berlin, 1870; 2: 693–723. - Experimental studies of the peripheral and central nervous system.
- Ueber die Kreuzung der Fasern in Chiasma nervorum optici. in Albrecht von Graefe's Archiv für Ophthalmologie, Berlin, 1874, 2 Abth., 20: 249–268; in Albrecht von Graefe's Archiv für Ophthalmologie, Berlin, 1879, 1 Abth., 25, 1-56.
- Experimentelle Untersuchungen über das Schädelwachstum (1874) - Experimental studies on the growth of the skull.

== Associated eponyms ==
- "Gudden's inferior commissure" (commissure of Gudden): Commissural fibers of the optic tract, situated above and behind the optic chiasm.
- "Gudden's tract": The transverse peduncular tract.
- "Gudden-Wanner sign": Shortening of bone conduction time of a tuning fork over bony cranial scars. Named in conjunction with otologist Friedrich Wanner (1870-1944).
- "Mammillo-tegmental bundle of Gudden": Also known as the fasciculus mammillo-tegmentalis.
- The dorsal and ventral tegmental nuclei of the pontine tegmentum, first described by von Gudden in the rabbit, are sometimes referred to as the "dorsal/ventral nuclei of Gudden".
