= Louis-Victor Marcé =

French psychiatrist

Louis-Victor Marcé (3 June 1828, Paris – August 1864) was a French psychiatrist.

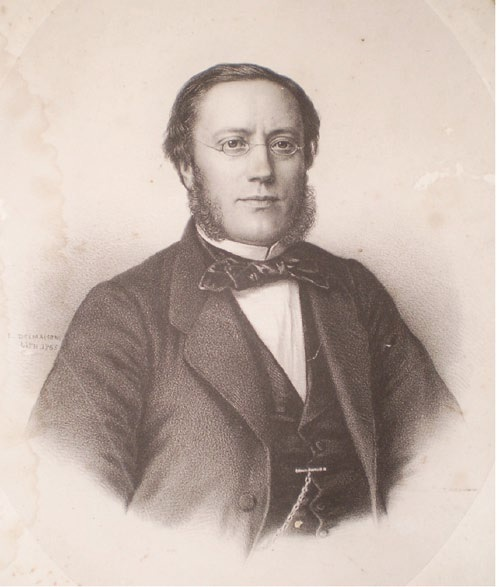
Louis-Victor Marcé

He initially studied medicine in Nantes, afterwards continuing his studies in Paris, where in 1852 he gained his internship. In 1856 he obtained his doctorate with a dissertation on spermatic cysts titled "Des kystes spermatiques ou de l'hydrocèle enkystée spermatique". Shortly afterwards, he served as médecin-adjoint to Jules Baillarger (1809-1890) and Jacques-Joseph Moreau (1804-1884) at a maison de santé in Ivry-sur-Seine. In 1860 he received his agrégation to the medical faculty in Paris, and during the same year, worked as chief medical officer at "Ferme Sainte-Anne". Soon afterwards he was assigned as a physician to the Bicêtre Hospital.

In 1858 he published an important, comprehensive monograph dealing with prepartum and postpartum psychiatric disorders titled "Traité de la folie des femmes enceintes, des nouvelles accouchées et des nourrices, et considérations médico-légales qui se rattachent à ce sujet" (Treatise on the madness of pregnant women, etc.). The "Société Marcé Francophone", a French association for the study of perinatal and puerperal psychiatry, is named in his honour.

In 1860, he issued an early work on anorexia nervosa titled "Note sur une forme de délire hypocondriaque consécutive aux dyspepsies et caractérisée principalement par le refus d'aliments" (On a form of hypochondriacal delirium occurring consecutive to dyspepsia and characterized by refusal of food). Here he provided the first psychological accounts of individuals with anorexia nervosa in regards to obstinate behavioral characteristics.

Neurologist Albert Pitres (1848-1928) credited Marcé for providing the first description for agraphia, based on a paper issued by Marcé in 1860.

== See also ==
- History of anorexia nervosa
