= Jules Baillarger =

French neurologist (1809–1890)

Jules Gabriel François Baillarger
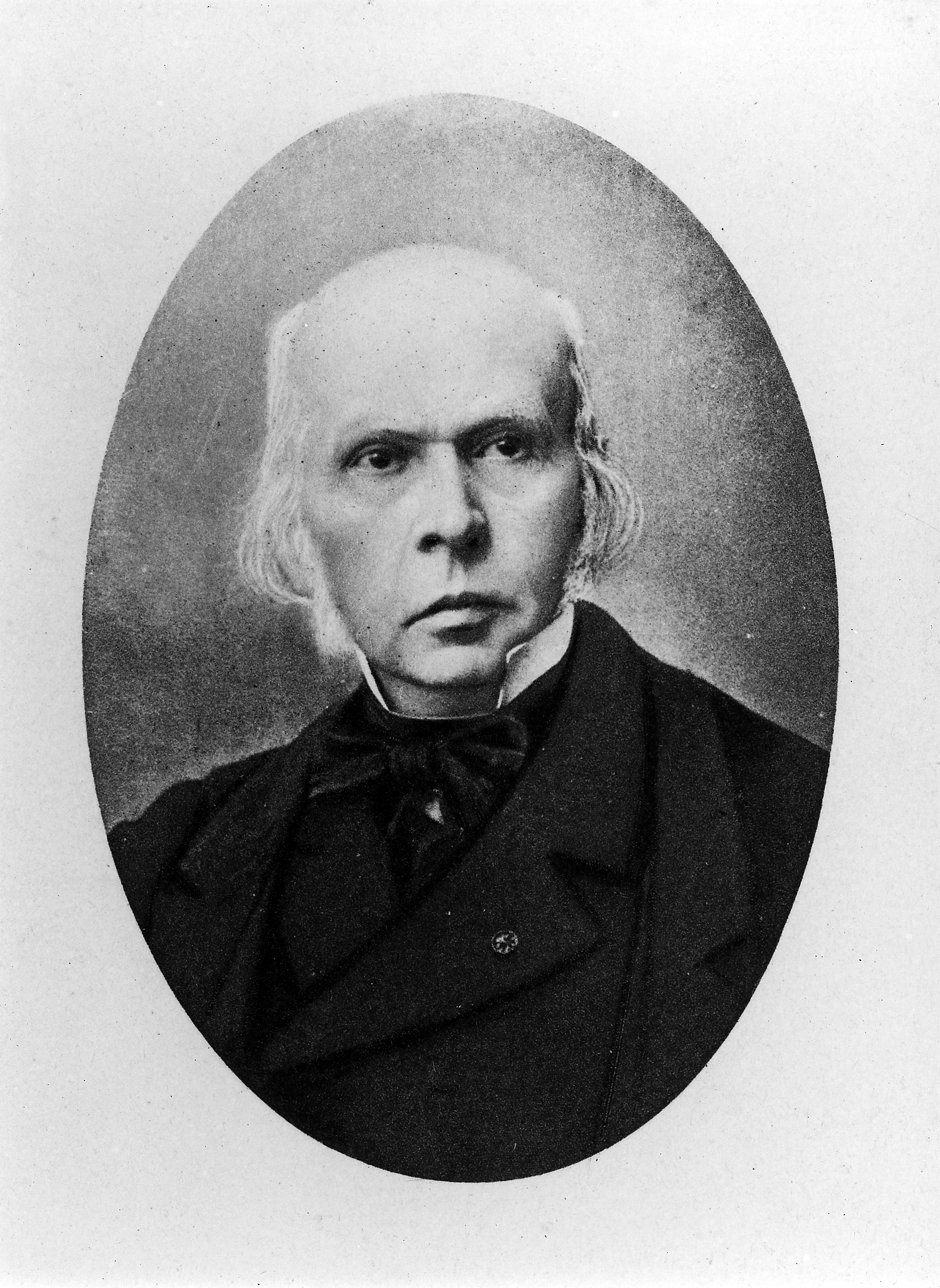
- Born: 25 March 1809; Montbazon, France
- Died: 31 December 1890 (aged 81); Paris, France
- Scientific career
- Fields: psychiatry, neurology

Jules Baillarger, full name Jules Gabriel François Baillarger (25 March 1809 – 31 December 1890), was a French neurologist and psychiatrist.

== Biography ==
Baillarger was born in Montbazon, France. He studied medicine at the University of Paris under Jean-Étienne Dominique Esquirol (1772–1840), and while a student worked as an intern at the Charenton mental institution. In 1840 he accepted a position at the Salpêtrière, and soon after became director of a maison de santé in Ivry-sur-Seine. Among his assistants at Ivry was Louis-Victor Marcé (1828–1864).

With Jacques-Joseph Moreau (1804–1884) and others, he founded the influential Annales médico-psychologiques (Medical-Psychological Annals).

== Contributions and theories ==
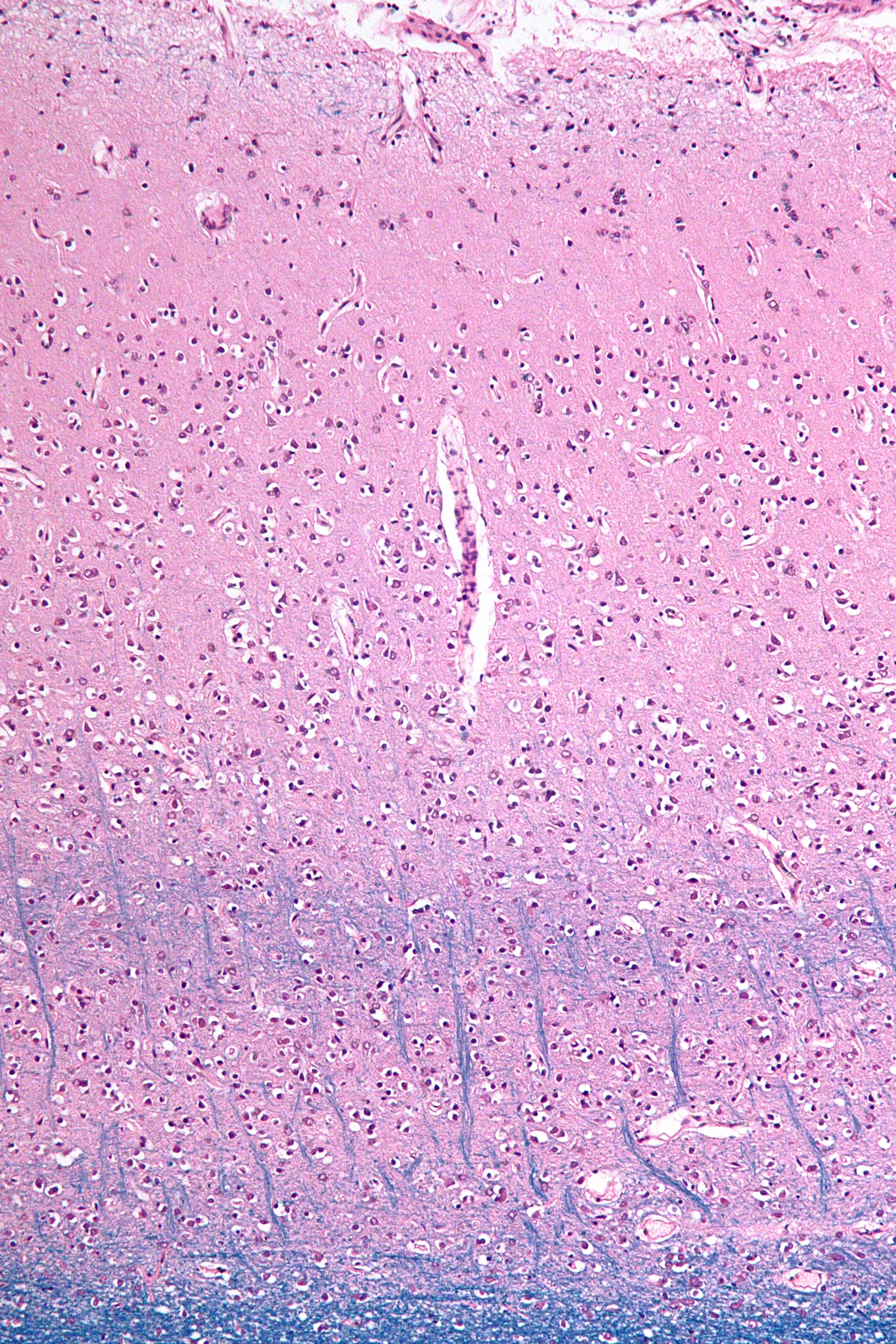
Intermediate magnification micrograph of visual cortex showing the bands of Baillarger; LFB stain.

In 1840 Baillarger was the first physician to discover that the cerebral cortex was divided into six layers of alternate white and grey laminae. His name is associated with the inner and outer bands of Baillarger, which are two layers of white fibers of the cerebral cortex. They are prominent in the sensory cortical areas because of high densities of thalamocortical fiber terminations. The outer band of Baillarger is especially prominent in the visual cortex, and is sometimes referred to as the band of Gennari.

In the field of psychiatry, Baillarger did research on the involuntary nature of hallucinations and the dynamics of the hypnagogic state (the intermediary stage between sleep and wakefulness). In 1854 he provided a description of a psychiatric disorder involving both manic and depressive episodes in the same individual, a condition that he referred to as folie à double forme (dual-form insanity). Unbeknownst to him at the time, another French psychiatrist, Jean-Pierre Falret (1794–1870), had described fundamentally the same condition (with a number of salient differences) in an article prior to Baillarger's findings. Falret referred to the disorder as folie circulaire (circular madness).

== Selected publications ==
- Recherches sur la structure de la couche corticale des circonvolutions du cerveau, (1840)
- Des hallucinations, des causes qui les produisent et des maladies caractérisent, Mémoires de l’Académie de Médecine (1842)
- Hallucinations, Annales médico-psychologiques du système nerveux, (1844)
- Folie à double forme, Annales médico-psychologiques du système nerveux, (1854)
- Recherches sur les maladies mentales, 2 volumes; (1890)
