= Band of Baillarger =

White matter fibres of the brain

Identifiers
- Acronym: Bands
- NeuroNames: 2154

The bands of Baillarger, in neuroanatomy, are two myeloarchitectural structures, the external band of Baillarger and the internal band of Baillarger. These are myelinated fibers that course in the internal granular layer (layer IV) and internal pyramidal layer (layer V), respectively, of cerebral cortex. In the primary visual cortex (V1), the external band of Baillarger is enlarged and is called the line of Gennari. They are named after Jules Baillarger.
