= Maryam Shanechi =

Iranian-American neuroscientist

Maryam M. Shanechi
- Awards: NIH Director's New Innovator Award MIT Technology Review's Innovators Under 35 NSF CAREER Award ONR Young Investigator Award American Society for Engineering Educations's Curtis W. McGraw Research Award Science News 10 Scientists to Watch Popular Science Brilliant 10

Academic background
- Education: University of Toronto, MIT
- Thesis: Real-time brain-machine interface architectures : neural decoding from plan to movement (2011)

Maryam M. Shanechi is an American neuroengineer. She studies ways of decoding the brain's activity to control brain-machine interfaces. She was honored as one of MIT Technology Review's Innovators under 35 in 2014, one of the Science News 10 scientists to watch in 2019, and a National Finalist for the Blavatnik Awards for Young Scientists in both 2023 and 2024. She is the Alexander A. Sawchuk Endowed Chair and Professor in Electrical and Computer Engineering, Computer Science, and Biomedical Engineering at the USC Viterbi School of Engineering, and a member of the Neuroscience Graduate Program at the University of Southern California.

== Early life and career ==
Shanechi received her bachelor's degree in engineering from the University of Toronto in 2004. She then moved to MIT, where she completed her master's degree in electrical engineering and computer science in 2006 and her PhD in 2011. She completed a postdoc at Harvard Medical School before moving to the University of California, Berkeley, in 2012. She held a faculty position at Cornell University, before moving to the University of Southern California, where she is currently Dean's Professor within the USC Viterbi School of Engineering.

== Research ==
While pursuing her graduate degree at MIT, Shanechi became interested in decoding the brain, the idea of reading out the original meaning from brain signals. She developed an algorithm to determine where a monkey wanted to point the cursor on a screen based on the animal's brain activity. She later improved upon her work by including high-rate decoding, meaning the decoding happened over a few milliseconds, rather than every 100 milliseconds, which is the standard for traditional methods. More recently, the Shanechi Lab has developed novel methods that can dissociate those dynamics in neural activity that are most predictive of behavior and can significantly improve decoding. Her lab has also developed methods that can simultaneously use multiple spatiotemporal scales of neural measurements to model their relationships and improve decoding.

In 2013, she developed a brain decoding method that could help automatically control the amount of anesthesia that is to be administered to a patient. Her team, which included colleagues from Massachusetts General Hospital and Massachusetts Institute of Technology was able to control the depth of the medically-induced coma in rodents automatically based on their brain activity.

Shanechi is also interested in the application of neural decoding algorithms to psychiatric disorders, such as PTSD and depression. Her research team developed a method to decipher the mood of a person from their brain activity. They measured the brain activity of seven patients who had electrodes implanted in their brain to monitor epilepsy. The patients answered questions about their mood while the electrodes were implanted. Using the data about the mood and the brain activity, Shanechi's lab was able to match the two together and decipher which brain activity was related to which mood. The paper on this work was awarded the 3rd prize in the International BCI Awards. Her lab has also developed a stochastic stimulation and modeling approach that can predict the response of multi-regional brain networks implicated in neuropsychiatric disorders to ongoing deep brain stimulation (DBS). In the future, Shanechi wants to develop these techniques in order to stimulate the brain automatically when a change in mood is detected.

== Awards ==
- NIH Director's New Innovator Award, 2020
- Science News 10 Scientists to Watch, 2019
- Popular Science Brilliant 10, 2015
- MIT Technology Review Innovators Under 35, 2014
- NSF CAREER Award, 2015
- Office of Naval Research Young Investigator Award, 2019
- American Society for Engineering Education (ASEE) Curtis W. McGraw Research Award, 2021
- Multidisciplinary University Research Initiative (MURI) Award, 2016
- Mid-Career Achievement Award, University of Toronto Engineering, 2019
- One Mind Rising Star Award, 2022

== Selected publications ==
Shanechi's publications include:

- Yang Y, Qiao S, Sani OG, Sedillo JI, Ferrentino B, Pesaran B, Shanechi MM (February 2021). "Modelling and prediction of the dynamic responses of large-scale brain networks during direct electrical stimulation". Nature Biomedical Engineering. 5 (4): 324–345. doi:10.1038/s41551-020-00666-w. PMID 33526909. S2CID 231753656.
- Abbaspourazad H, Choudhury M, Wong YT, Pesaran B, Shanechi MM (January 2021). "Multiscale low-dimensional motor cortical state dynamics predict naturalistic reach-and-grasp behavior". Nature Communications. 12 (1): 607. Bibcode:2021NatCo..12..607A. doi:10.1038/s41467-020-20197-x. PMC 7840738. PMID 33504797.
- Sani OG, Abbaspourazad H, Wong YT, Pesaran B, Shanechi MM (January 2021). "Modeling behaviorally relevant neural dynamics enabled by preferential subspace identification" (PDF). Nature Neuroscience. 24 (1): 140–149. doi:10.1038/s41593-020-00733-0. PMID 33169030. S2CID 226296000.
- Shanechi MM (October 2019). "Brain-machine interfaces from motor to mood". Nature Neuroscience. 22 (10): 1554–1564. doi:10.1038/s41593-019-0488-y. PMID 31551595. S2CID 202749166.
- Sani, Omid G.; Yang, Yuxiao; Lee, Morgan B.; Dawes, Heather E.; Chang, Edward F.; Shanechi, Maryam M. (2018). "Mood variations decoded from multi-site intracranial human brain activity". Nature Biotechnology. 36 (10): 954–961. doi:10.1038/nbt.4200. ISSN 1546-1696. PMID 30199076. S2CID 205285998.
- Shanechi, Maryam M.; Orsborn, Amy L.; Moorman, Helene G.; Gowda, Suraj; Dangi, Siddharth; Carmena, Jose M. (2017). "Rapid control and feedback rates enhance neuroprosthetic control". Nature Communications. 8 (1) 13825. Bibcode:2017NatCo...813825S. doi:10.1038/ncomms13825. ISSN 2041-1723. PMC 5227098. PMID 28059065.
- Shanechi, Maryam; Hu, Rollin; Marissa, Powers; Wornell, Gregory; Brown, Emery; Williams, Ziv (2012). "Neural population partitioning and a concurrent brain-machine interface for sequential motor function". Nature Neuroscience. 15 (12): 1715–1722. doi:10.1038/nn.3250. PMC 3509235. PMID 23143511.
- Shanechi, Maryam M.; Chemali, Jessica J.; Liberman, Max; Solt, Ken; Brown, Emery N. (2013-10-31). "A Brain-Machine Interface for Control of Medically-Induced Coma". PLOS Computational Biology. 9 (10) e1003284. Bibcode:2013PLSCB...9E3284S. doi:10.1371/journal.pcbi.1003284. ISSN 1553-7358. PMC 3814408. PMID 24204231.
