= Neural Networks (journal) =

- Discipline: Computer science
- Language: English
- Edited by: DeLiang Wang, Kenji Doya

Publication details
- History: 1988-present
- Publisher: Elsevier
- Frequency: Monthly
- Impact factor: 7.8 (2022)

Standard abbreviations
- ISO 4: Neural Netw.

Indexing
- CODEN: NNETEB
- ISSN: 0893-6080
- LCCN: 88649048
- OCLC no.: 798872932

Links
- Journal homepage; Online access

Neural Networks is a monthly peer-reviewed scientific journal and an official journal of the International Neural Network Society, European Neural Network Society, and Japanese Neural Network Society.

== History ==
The journal was established in 1988 and is published by Elsevier. It covers all aspects of research on artificial neural networks. The founding editor-in-chief was Stephen Grossberg (Boston University).

The current editors-in-chief are DeLiang Wang (Ohio State University) and Taro Toyoizumi (RIKEN Center for Brain Science).

== Abstracting and indexing ==
The journal is abstracted and indexed in Scopus and the Science Citation Index Expanded. According to the Journal Citation Reports, the journal has a 2022 impact factor of 7.8.
