= Onuf's nucleus =

Group of neurons

- Spinal cord - grey matter (Onuf's nucleus not labeled, but region is visible)

Details

Identifiers
- Latin: nucleus nervi pudendi
- TA98: A14.1.02.139
- TA2: 6084
- FMA: 77024

Onuf's nucleus is a distinct group of neurons located in the ventral part (lamina IX) of the anterior horn of the sacral region of the human spinal cord involved in the maintenance of micturition and defecatory continence, as well as muscular contraction during orgasm. It contains motor neurons, and is the origin of the pudendal nerve. The sacral region of the spinal cord is the fourth segment (cervical, thoracic, and lumbar being the first three) of vertebrae in the spinal cord which consists of the vertebrae 26-30. While working in New York City in 1899, Bronislaw Onuf-Onufrowicz discovered this group of unique cells and originally identified it as “Group X.” “Group X” was considered distinct by Onufrowicz because the cells were different in size from the surrounding neurons in the anterolateral group, suggesting that they were independent.

== Structure ==
Onuf's nucleus is a distinct group of neurons located in the ventral part (lamina IX) of the anterior horn of the sacral region of the human spinal cord involved in the maintenance of micturition and defecatory continence, as well as muscular contraction during orgasm. It contains motor neurons, and is the origin of the pudendal nerve. The sacral region of the spinal cord is the fourth segment (cervical, thoracic, and lumbar being the first three) of vertebrae in the spinal cord which consists of the vertebrae 26-30.

This small group of neural cells is located between S1 and S2 or S2 and S3 and although Onuf's nucleus is located primarily in S2, it can extend to the caudal end of the first sacral segment or to the middle part of the third sacral segment. Also, Onuf's nucleus is found almost symmetrically on both sides of the ventral horn. This innervation, or nerve supply, is arranged in a neuropil and averages approximately 625 neurons in both the left and right ventral horns, and measures about 4–6 mm on each side. In other animals it averages approximately 300-500 on both sides.

Many staining techniques have been used to study the anatomy of Onuf's nucleus. The Nissl method was commonly used as well as myelin sheath stains and silver stains. Use of the Klüver-Barrera staining method showed that Onuf's nucleus appears clear due to the presence of many vertically arranged unmyelinated fibers. The sizes of the cells in Onuf's nucleus are small in comparison to other lateral group cells. The neurons in Onuf's nucleus are motoneurons, and like most motoneurons they are characterized by their multipolarity and large Nissl bodies.

== Function ==
Onuf's nucleus is the origin of innervation for the striated muscles of the rectum and urethral sphincters. The neurons of Onuf's nucleus are responsible for controlling external sphincter muscles of the anus and urethra in humans. Onufrowicz also proposed that Onuf's nucleus controlled the ischiocavernosus and bulbocavernosus muscles which function in penile erection and ejaculation in males. The dorsomedial subnucleus innervates the external anal sphincter and the ventrolateral subgroup connects to the external urethral sphincter.

=== Somatic ===
- The motor neurons of Onuf's nucleus innervate striated musculature (rhabdosphincter muscle) which is controlled voluntarily.
- Neurons in Onuf's nucleus lack autonomic dense-core vesicles even though they receive the same synaptic endings as alpha motor neurons.
- A study by Bergmann et al. showed that Onuf nucleus cells have the same cytoskeletal abnormalities as alpha motor neurons in motor neuron disease/amyotrophic lateral sclerosis.

=== Autonomic ===
- Diseases characterized by disturbances in urination and defecation affect autonomic and Onuf's nucleus cells similarly.
- Both cell types are spared by amyotrophic lateral sclerosis.
- Onuf's nucleus cells are anatomically linked with the sacral parasympathetic motor neurons and have many peptidergic nerve terminals.
- Cells in Onuf's nucleus resemble autonomic neurons and do not receive afferents from adjacent neurons.

=== Neurotransmitters in Onuf's nucleus ===
The motoneurons in Onuf's nucleus contain a dense array of serotonin and norepinephrine receptors and neurotransmitters and are activated by glutamate. When the 5-HT and NE receptors are stimulated, the guarding reflex occurs to prevent voiding of the bladder caused by unexpected abdominal pressure.

=== Sexual dimorphism ===
Onuf's nucleus is sexually dimorphic, meaning that there are differences in Onuf's nucleus between males and females of the same species. Sexual dimorphism of Onuf's nucleus has been found in dogs, monkeys, and humans. Males of these species have more of these motoneurons than do their female counterparts. It has also been shown that the sex differences in Onuf's nucleus can be reduced (or in some cases eliminated) by exposing a prenatal female to high levels of androgen.

== Clinical significance ==
=== Urinary stress incontinence ===
Stress urinary incontinence (SUI) is a common disease in women caused by pelvic floor muscle weakness. Coughing, laughing, sneezing, exercising or other movements that increase intra-abdominal pressure, and thus increase pressure on the bladder, are common reasons for urine loss.

There are three layers of muscle that are known to control urine flow through the urethra; an inner band of longitudinal smooth muscle, a middle band of circular smooth muscle, and an external band of striated muscle called the rhabdosphincter. The urethra is controlled by the sympathetic, parasympathetic, and somatic divisions of the peripheral nervous system. The sympathetic innervation (nerve supply) comes from the sympathetic preganglionic neurons located in the upper lumbar spinal cord along the hypogastric nerve and terminates in the longitudinal and circular smooth muscle layers in the urethra. The parasympathetic nerve supply comes from the parasympathetic preganglionic neurons in the sacral spinal cord and also terminates in the longitudinal and circular smooth muscle layers. Finally the somatic nerve supply arises from the urethral sphincter motor neurons in the ventral horn of the sacral spinal cord; better known as Onuf's nucleus. The pudendal nerve that extends from Onuf's nucleus, connects directly to the rhabdosphincter muscle to control micturation.

The sympathetic storage reflex or pelvic-to-hypo-gastric reflex is initiated when the bladder swells. Stretch receptors cause postganglionic neurons to release norepinephrine (NE). NE causes the bladder to relax and the urethra to contract, thus preventing urine loss. The somatic storage reflex or the pelvic-to-pudendal or guarding reflex is initiated when one laughs, sneezes, or coughs, which causes increased bladder pressure. Glutamate is the primary excitatory transmitter for the reflex. Glutamate activates NMDA and AMPA receptors which produce action potentials. These action potentials activate the release of acetylcholine causing the rhabdosphincter muscle fibers to contract. When the guarding reflex does not function normally, SUI occurs.

Duloxetine

Onuf's nucleus controls rhabdosphincter motor neurons and has been shown to contain a dense array of 5-HT (serotonin) and NE terminals. 5-HT and NE were shown to inhibit bladder activity. In 2005, researchers Wolfgang H. Jost and Parvaneh Marsalek used serotonin norepinephrine reuptake inhibitors (SNRI) to increase the synaptic levels of both 5-HT and NE in the synaptic cleft. Duloxetine hydrochloride, a SNRI, has been shown to increase bladder capacity and sphincteric muscle activity in animals and humans exhibiting irritated bladder function. Duloxetine is the first medication developed to help SUI. This is promising because Duloxetine also showed no effect on bladder contraction force or duration which suggests that Duloxetine is affecting the sensory limb of the urination process. 5-HT and NE do not function through direct excitation of motor neurons but facilitate the effects of glutamate. When glutamatergic activation in sphincter motor neurons is absent there is no effect of NE or 5-HT (seen during micturition contraction).

=== Amyotrophic lateral sclerosis ===
Amyotrophic lateral sclerosis ( Lou Gehrig disease ) is a disease that causes degeneration of motoneurons that control voluntary muscle movement. Surprisingly, the bladder and rectum sphincters remain normal even during the final terminal stages of the illness. Since these muscles are controlled by Onuf's nucleus, it is of great importance in the study of this disease. In amyotrophic lateral sclerosis, Onuf's nucleus is preserved but the other anterior horn cell groups atrophy. This discovery reinforced the notion that Onuf's nucleus controlled the muscles related to sphincter function in the anus and urethra.

In a study conducted by Kihira et al., eight individuals with amyotrophic lateral sclerosis were compared to nine control cases. The results indicated that the total number of neurons in Onuf's nucleus in patients with amyotrophic lateral sclerosis did not differ from the control patients. However, normal neurons decreased in number while atrophic neurons increased. It was also shown that the decrease in the number of normal neurons was not due to aging. Patients with amyotrophic lateral sclerosis also contain less RNA in their motoneurons than normal individuals. The decrease in RNA is correlated with the decrease in size of the nucleolus. Thus, the size of the nucleolus may be an early indicator of amyotrophic lateral sclerosis.

There is often sparing of Onuf's nucleus in spinal muscular atrophy type 1.

=== Shy–Drager syndrome ===
In order to study Onuf's nucleus from the opposite perspective (meaning cases where it was not preserved) studies were done on Shy–Drager syndrome. Shy–Drager syndrome is a rare neurodegenerative disease that attacks the autonomic nervous system. Since the main symptom of Shy–Drager syndrome is incontinence it makes it a good candidate to study its effects on Onuf's nucleus. When the sacral sections of the spinal cord were studied in patients with Shy–Drager syndrome, it was revealed that cell death was confined to the area of Onuf's nucleus. This, once again, verified the role Onuf's nucleus in vesicorectal function.

== History ==
While working in New York City in 1899, Bronislaw Onuf-Onufrowicz discovered this group of unique cells and originally identified it as “Group X.” “Group X” was considered distinct by Onufrowicz because the cells were different in size from the surrounding neurons in the anterolateral group, suggesting that they were independent.

== Other animals ==
Onuf's nucleus is not specific only to humans. As mentioned before, the motor neurons of the external urethral sphincter and the external anal sphincter are found in ventral horn of the second sacral segment known as Onuf's nucleus. Using horseradish peroxidase to stain the neurons, it has been determined that the external anal sphincter motoneurons are located in dorsomedial to the external urethral sphincter motoneuron in the cat, dog, monkey, golden hamster, as well as the man. However, the location of these motoneurons differs in the rat, Mongolian gerbil and domestic pig. In the rat, these motoneurons are located in separate cell groups.

In addition to differences among location of the motoneurons responsible or sphincter function, it is important to mention the differences in sexual dimorphism between species. Although sexual dimorphism of Onuf's nucleus is present in all species, the extent of the sexual dimorphism varies. For example, sexual dimorphism in the number of perineal motoneurons is less obvious in dogs and humans than it is in rats. This is to be expected because female dogs retain perineal muscles whereas female rats do not have perineal muscles. As in humans, prenatal androgen plays an important role in establishing the sex differences in Onuf's nucleus of these species. If a female is exposed to excess androgen during the prenatal period, the sexual dimorphism does not occur in Onuf's nucleus.
