= Howard Eichenbaum =

American psychologist

- Born: October 16, 1947
- Died: July 21, 2017 (aged 69); Boston, Massachusetts
- Scientific career
- Fields: Psychology, Neuroscience
- Workplaces: Boston University, Wellesley College

Howard B. Eichenbaum (October 16, 1947 – July 21, 2017) was an American psychologist and neuroscientist who studied the hippocampus. He was a university professor and director of the Center for Memory and Brain at Boston University, having previously worked at Wellesley College. He was the editor-in-chief of the scientific journal Hippocampus.

== Research on the role of hippocampus in memory function ==
Eichenbaum performed extensive research on the role of the hippocampus in memory function, presenting a theory of the role of the hippocampus in forming relational memories. This work was important for emphasizing the behavioral role of the hippocampus beyond forming spatial representations of the environment. Eichenbaum and his collaborators performed early studies emphasizing the non-spatial responses of hippocampal neurons, showing spiking responses selective to individual odors and reward delivery during performance of behavioral tasks.

== Research on context-selective neuronal responses ==
Research by Eichenbaum also demonstrated the strong context-dependence of neuronal responses in the hippocampus. One study from his lab at Boston University presented data from rats performing a spatial alternation task with return arms. As the rat ran up the stem of the task on different trials, the spiking response of hippocampal neurons depended on the prior or future response of the rat, showing differential firing even though the location and movement direction of the rat was the same. This illustrated the strong memory dependence of hippocampal neuronal responses independent of the spatial location and movement of the rat. This experiment and other data from his laboratory show how different events in the same location could be coded as different episodes.

== Research on time cells ==
Research by Eichenbaum and others has demonstrated that individual neurons in the hippocampus and other regions show spiking activity at specific time intervals during behavioral tasks. Eichenbaum described these neurons as "time cells" and argued that the same neurons could equally act as place cells. The loss of time cells in the hippocampus may contribute to the loss of episodic memory function described in patient HM. Time cells may contribute to the role of the hippocampus in allowing what Tulving termed mental time travel in the recall of past episodic memories. Time cells may code individual time intervals necessary to disambiguate different temporal episodes within an episodic memory.
