= Steven M. Paul =

American neuroscientist and pharmaceutical executive

- Citizenship: U.S
- Education: Tulane University (BS) (MS) (MD), Homewood-Flossmoor High School
- Occupations: Neuroscientist; Psychiatrist; Biopharmaceutical executive

Steven M. Paul is an American neuroscientist, psychiatrist, and biopharmaceutical executive. As of 2025, Paul is the co-founder and board chair of Rapport Therapeutics and Seaport Therapeutics. He is the former CEO and board chair of Karuna Therapeutics. Paul is a Venture Partner at Third Rock Ventures. Paul is also a professor of psychiatry and neurology at Washington University School of Medicine in St. Louis.

== Early life and education ==
Paul received his bachelor's, master's, and medical degree from Tulane University. He acquired his master's and MD degree from the same university in 1975. He spent a year as a resident in psychiatry at the University of Chicago before joining the National Institute of Mental Health (NIMH). He is a 1968 graduate of Homewood-Flossmoor High School.

From 1980 to 2000, Paul was ranked among the top 50 neuroscientists in the world by the Institute for Scientific Information.

== Career ==
At NIMH, he joined the laboratory of Nobelist Julius Axelrod to work on steroid metabolism in the brain, an area of research that as of 2025 Paul continues to pursue.

In the late 70s, Paul and his colleague, Phil Skolnick, began a series of projects on benzodiazepines and GABAA receptors, resulting in several publications on various drugs shown to produce their anxiolytic, sedative-hypnotic, and anesthetic properties via these receptors.

In 1989, he was the senior scientist on a paper published in Nature that undercut the claim that mutations in a gene on chromosome 11 caused bipolar disorder, which previously had been hailed as evidence that studies of genetics would lead to definitive biomarkers for mental illnesses. Around this time, he became the scientific director of intramural research at NIMH.

Paul and Dorota Majewska, in his lab, were the first to report that the major progesterone metabolites allopregnanolone and pregnanolone were potent positive allosteric modulators of GABAA receptors. Together with Robert Purdy and A. Leslie Morrow, Paul’s lab went on to show stress-related elevations of allopregnanolone in both serum and brain of rats providing evidence for both peripheral and de novo synthesis of allopregnanolone in the brain.

Paul moved to Eli Lilly and Company in 1993 as vice president for central nervous system discovery and decision-phase medical research. A New York Times reporter described him in 1996 as "one of those at the forefront of the development of the coming breed of psychiatric medications." In 1998, he was named group vice president, therapeutic area discovery research and clinical investigation, and by 2003 he was Lilly's executive vice president for science and technology and president of [[Lilly Research Laboratories]]. He helped organize cooperation and funding from pharmaceutical companies in establishing the Alzheimer's Disease Neuroimaging Initiative (ADNI), a non-proprietary collaborative research effort to develop imaging and blood based biomarkers for Alzheimer's disease and overseen by the foundation for the NIH (FNIH). Paul is currently the chairman of the board of directors of the FNIH.

In the early 2000s, Paul helped lead Lilly toward a new drug discovery and development model that focused on getting proof of concept as early as possible in the research process to avoid failures in Phase II and III clinical trials. As part of that effort, he helped establish Lilly Chorus. This autonomous virtual business unit was created to design and execute studies that would allow drug candidates to be developed through “proof-of-concept” instead of lingering in a company's pipeline. He assisted Lilly in overseeing the development of Zyprexa and Cymbalta, two of its major products for treating schizophrenia and depression, respectively. Paul was also the senior author of the paper which first demonstrated the antipsychotic properties of xanomeline, the CNS-active pharmaceutical ingredient in KarXT, the compound now FDA approved as Cobenfy, the first novel non-dopamine receptor antipsychotic drug being marketed by Bristol-Myers Squibb by his new company "Karuna Therapeutics."

Paul also led Lilly's work on Alzheimer's drug solanezumab, which failed in Phase III clinical trials. In addition, he expanded Lilly’s presence in New York through the acquisition and development of ImClone Systems into a new research space. He also helped establish a biotechnology center in San Diego after Lilly purchased Applied Molecular Evolution.

Paul retired from Lilly in 2010 and joined the faculty of Weil Cornell Medical College in New York City. In 2010, he also joined Third Rock Ventures as a venture partner. In 2011, he co-founded Sage Therapeutics with Third Rock partner Kevin Starr and collaborator Douglas Covey of Washington University School of Medicine in St. Louis.

Sage's research is based on earlier work Paul carried out at NIMH, which showed that certain neurosteroids, including the major metabolite of progesterone, allopregnanolone are potent positive allosteric modulators of GABAA receptors and have rapid anxiolytic and antidepressant effects in various animal models.

In 2014, he took over as the CEO of Voyager Therapeutics, a gene therapy company he co-founded with mark levin and Jim Geraghty.

In 2018, Paul became the CEO, president and chairperson of Karuna Therapeutics, a public CNS biotechnology company developing a novel antipsychotic called KarXT, for both schizophrenia and dementia related psychosis in Alzheimer’s disease. Karuna was acquired by Bristol-Myers Squibb in December 2023 for $14 billion.

Paul is the former CEO, president, and chairperson of Karuna Therapeutics.

In 2024, Paul co-founded Rapport Therapeutics with David Bredt, Reid Huber and Jeff Tong from Third Rock Ventures. In 2024, Paul also co-founded Seaport Therapeutics with Daphne Zohar.

=== Boards and memberships ===
Paul is an elected member of the National Academy of Medicine and a fellow of the American Association for the Advancement of Science (AAAS).

He is also an elected fellow emeritus of the American College of Neuropsychopharmacology (ACNP) and served as ACNP President (1999). As of 2025, he was on the board of directors or is a trustee of several organizations, including serving as chairman of the board of the Foundation for the NIH (FNIH) a member of the board of trustees at Tulane University, board chair at Seaport Therapeutics, Chairman of the Board at Rapport Therapeutics, He is a former director of Alnylam Pharmaceuticals, Sage Therapeutics, Voyager Therapeutics and Karuna Therapeutics.

=== As an author ===
He has authored over 600 papers and book chapters.
