= Friedrich Groos =

German physician and philosopher

Friedrich Groos (23 April 1768 – 15 June 1852) was a German physician and philosopher born in Karlsruhe.

Initially a student of law in Tübingen and Stuttgart, his interest later turned to medicine. From 1792 studied medicine in Freiburg im Breisgau and Pavia, and following graduation became city physician (Stadtphysikus) in Karlsruhe. From 1805 to 1813 he worked as a doctor in several locations, and in 1814 became a senior physician at the asylum and Siechenanstalt in Pforzheim. With the 1826 relocation of the Pforzheim mental asylum to Heidelberg, he moved to the latter city, where he also gave lectures in psychiatry at the university.

Groos was the author of works in several subjects, such as philosophy, forensic medicine, psychiatry, et al. During a period of severe illness, he became deeply interested in Stoic philosophy. As a psychiatrist he believed that mental illness was due to spiritual as well as mental causes.

== Written works ==
- Betrachtungen über die moralische Freiheit und Unsterblichkeit, 1818 - Reflections on moral freedom and immortality.
- Über das homöopathische Heilprincip. Ein kritisches Wort, 1825 - On the homeopathic health principle; a critical word.
- Untersuchungen über die moralischen und organischen Bedingungen des Irreseyns und der Lasterhaftigkeit, 1826 - Studies on the moral and organic conditions of insanity and depravity.
- Entwurf einer philosophischen Grundlage für die Lehre von den Geisteskrankheiten, 1828 - Philosophical basis for the doctrine of mental illness.
- Ideen zur Begründung eines obersten Princips für die psychische Legalmedicin, 1829 - Ideas for the creation of a supreme principle for forensic psychiatry.
- Die Schellingsche Gottes- und Freiheitslehre vor den Richterstuhl der gesunden Vernunft gefordert, 1829 - Schelling's God and doctrine of freedom before the tribunal of common sense.
- Der Weg durch den Vorhof der politischen Freiheit zum Tempel der moralischen Freiheit, 1849 - The path through the atrium of political freedom to the temple of moral freedom.
