= Phil Skolnick =

Phil Skolnick (born 26 February 1947) is an American neuroscientist and pharmacologist most widely known for his work on the psychopharmacology of depression and anxiety, as well as on addiction medicine. Author of more than 500 published papers, Skolnick's most notable accomplishments include elucidating the role of the NMDA system in depression therapeutics, demonstrating the existence of endogenous benzodiazepine receptor ligands, and spearheading the National Institute on Drug Abuse's partnership to develop a naloxone atomizer for reversal of acute opioid overdose. Skolnick's work also laid the foundation for the development of ketamine as a rapid-acting antidepressant.

== Early life and education ==
Raised in a Manhattan tenement, Skolnick attended Stuyvesant High School, one of New York City's most selective specialized high schools. Graduating at the age of 16, he began attending Brooklyn College of Pharmacy of Long Island University in 1964. After graduating summa cum laude in 1968, he attended George Washington University's school of medicine in Washington, D.C. receiving a PhD in pharmacology.

== Career ==
=== National Institutes of Health ===
Shortly after graduating from GWU in 1972, Skolnick was brought on as a staff fellow at what is now the National Institute of Diabetes and Digestive and Kidney diseases (NIDDK), a subdivision of the National Institutes of Health (NIH), where he was mentored by John Daly. In 1983, Skolnick became section chief of NIDDK's neurobiology laboratory, rising to the role of Chief of the NIDDK Laboratory of Neuroscience in 1986. During his time at NIH, Skolnick trained more than 75 postdocs.

==== Anxiety: barbiturate and benzodiazepine systems ====
In 1981, Skolnick and colleague Steven M. Paul characterized the mechanism of action of benzodiazepines, showing that they act by modifying the efficacy of the brain's primary inhibitory neurotransmitter, GABA. The following year, Skolnick and Paul, among other collaborators, showed that mammalian brain tissue contains endogenous ligands of the benzodiazepine receptor, some of the first evidence of so-called endozepines.

In 1985, not long after becoming section chief of NIDDK's neurobiology lab, Skolnick and colleagues published work helping to characterize the mechanism of action of barbiturates, which function as positive allosteric modulators at the GABA_{A} receptor—a mechanism of action they share with benzodiazepines. Later, inspired by similarities between the electroencephalographic signatures associated with hepatic coma and benzodiazepine-induced coma, Skolnick hypothesized that impaired metabolism of endogenous benzodiazepine receptor ligands may play a role in producing the symptoms of hepatic encephalopathy. This hypothesis was borne out by experimental research, where it was shown that benzodiazepine receptor antagonists can temporarily alleviate some of the cognitive symptoms of fulminant hepatic failure.

==== NMDA systems, depression, aminoglycosides ====
By the late 1980s, it was known that certain types of stress induce a behavioral profile in animals that bears a strong resemblance to the symptoms of clinical depression, and that symptoms in this experimental model respond to antidepressants such as SSRIs. This depression-like effect arises, in part, through prolonged stimulation of the NMDA subtype of the glutamate receptor. This led Skolnick and colleagues to discover in 1990 that inhibition of activity at the NMDA receptor (NMDAr) can prevent the development of this depression-like behavior, suggesting NMDA receptor antagonists—such as ketamine—as novel antidepressant therapies.

In 1996, Skolnick and one of his postdoctoral students, Anthony Basile, developed the hypothesis that off-site activity of aminoglycoside antibiotics, which also have the potential to land on the NMDA receptor, might be responsible for the drugs' undesirable ototoxic side-effects. Skolnick and Basile proved this hypothesis by counteracting the ototoxic effects of aminoglycosides using an NMDAr antagonist.

=== Eli Lilly & Company ===
In 1997, 25 years after joining the NIH, Skolnick was recruited by former collaborator Steven M. Paul to become a Lilly Fellow in Neuroscience at Eli Lilly & Company, where he worked toward the development of novel therapeutics for depression, applying the principles of rational drug design to synthesize and investigate new molecules.

=== DOV Pharmaceuticals ===
In 2001, Skolnick left Lilly for the New Jersey–based DOV Pharmaceutical, where he acted as Chief Scientific Officer and Senior Vice President of Research. During his tenure at DOV, Skolnick oversaw development and testing of a variety of novel drugs, including the anti-anxiety candidate molecule DOV 51892—an "anxioselective" compound which is designed to produce the anxiety-alleviating effects of typical anxiolytics, but without the sedative side-effects usually characteristic of this class of drug. In addition to his role as the CSO and Senior Vice President of Research, Skolnick became president of DOV Pharmaceutical in 2007 before departing in 2009.

=== National Institute on Drug Abuse ===
After his tenure at DOV, Skolnick returned to the NIH in 2010, this time as the director of the National Institute on Drug Abuse's Division of Therapeutics and Medical Consequences (DTMC), which focuses largely on pharmacological therapies for addiction. Most notably, Skolnick's time at NIDA saw the FDA approval and deployment of the Narcan nasal spray tool, an easy-to-use opioid overdose reversal device developed in partnership with Lightlake Therapeutics. Narcan nasal spray is intended for distribution to the general public, allowing the friends or family of an overdose victim to counteract the drug's effects almost immediately, without waiting for emergency response personnel to arrive. Many lives are lost due to drug users' hesitance to contact emergency services, a trend which Narcan nasal spray may help combat.

=== Opiant Pharmaceuticals ===
In early 2017, Skolnick re-retired from NIH to serve as Chief Scientific Officer of Opiant Pharmaceuticals, Inc.—manufacturers of the Narcan nasal spray device.
