= P. J. Snow =

Australian neuroscientist and author

Peter John Snow (born 25 February 1948) is an Australian neuroscientist and author.

== Life ==
Shortly after his birth in Jubbulpore, India, his father retired from the British Army and moved to Australia. In 1970 Snow graduated with First Class Honors in Zoology. He then enrolled in a PhD program at the University of Alberta, completing his dissertation in invertebrate neurobiology in 1974 before moving to the University Edinburgh, as a Canadian Medical Research Fellow. During this period he pioneered techniques for injecting single mammalian nerve cells with tracers and used these to extensively study the neuronal microcircuitry of the sensory systems within the spinal cord.

In 1976, Snow was awarded a Queen's Fellowship in Marine Science to study the nervous system of crustaceans at the Australian National University. In 1978, he was appointed to the faculty of the Anatomy Department, University of Queensland where, until his retirement in 1998, he supervised several large medical research programs on the plasticity of the central nervous system and the representation and control of pain. Over this period Snow also conducted extensive studies on the neurobiology of sharks and stingrays which included research on their somatosensory systems, centers of aggression and ability to withstand extreme hypoxia.

Since retiring from university Snow has devoted himself to writing 'The Human Psyche' and to delivering a number of lectures on the human psyche, including the Alberta Heritage Foundation of Medical Research Lecture.

== Professional associations ==
Snow is a member of the International Brain Research Organization (IBRO) and an emeritus member of the Society for Neuroscience (USA). He was also a founding member of the Australian Neuroscience Society (retired), the Australian Physiological & Pharmacological Society (retired) and the Primate Society of America (retired)

== Literary and scientific works ==
Snow is author of numerous scientific papers, reviews and book chapters and is coauthor, with Dr. P. Wilson, of an extensive monograph on plasticity and development in the somatosensory system. In late 2009, he published the first comprehensive, neuroscientifically-based book on the human psyche.

== Selected publications ==
- Snow PJ, Rose PK, Brown AG (January 1976). "Tracing axons and axon collaterals of spinal neurons using intracellular injection of horseradish peroxidase". Science. 191 (4224): 312–3. doi:10.1126/science.54936. PMID 54936.
- Leah JD, Cameron AA, Snow PJ (May 1985). "Neuropeptides in physiologically identified mammalian sensory neurones". Neurosci. Lett. 56 (3): 257–63. doi:10.1016/0304-3940(85)90252-6. PMID 2410816.
- Snow, P.J.; Wilson, P. (1990). "Denervation induced changes in somatotopic organization, the ineffective projections of afferent fibres and structural plasticity". In Cervero, F.; Bennet, G.J.; Headley, P.M. (eds.). Processing of Sensory Information in the Superficial Dorsal Horn of the Spinal Cord. Pleum Press. pp. 285–306.
- Cameron AA, Plenderleith MB, Snow PJ (July 1990). "Organization of the spinal cord in four species of elasmobranch fish: cytoarchitecture and distribution of serotonin and selected neuropeptides". J. Comp. Neurol. 297 (2): 201–18. doi:10.1002/cne.902970204. PMID 2370320.
- Snow PJ, Lumb BM, Cervero F (January 1992). "The representation of prolonged and intense, noxious somatic and visceral stimuli in the ventrolateral orbital cortex of the cat". Pain. 48 (1): 89–99. doi:10.1016/0304-3959(92)90135-X. PMID 1738579.
- Wilson P, Snow PJ (December 1993). "Morphology of A beta hair follicle afferent collaterals in dorsal horn of cats with neonatal chronic denervation of digits". J. Neurophysiol. 70 (6): 2399–410. doi:10.1152/jn.1993.70.6.2399. PMID 8120589.

=== Scientific monographs ===
- Snow, P.J.; Wilson, P. (1991). Plasticity in the Somatosensory System of Mature and Developing Mammals. Progress in Sensory Physiology. Vol. 11. Springer-Verlag. ISBN 9780387525730.

=== Literary work (non-fiction) ===
- Snow, P.J. (2009). The Human Psyche in Love, War and Enlightenment. Brisbane: Boolarong Press. pp. 1–495. Archived from the original on 4 April 2011.
