= A. Kimberley McAllister =

Developmental and cellular/molecular neuroscience, neuroimmunology

- Born: June 30, 1966 (age 60); Washington, D.C.
- Education: Duke University (Ph.D.) Davidson College
- Organization(s): University of California, Davis
- Known for: Developmental and cellular/molecular neuroscience, neuroimmunology
- Website: https://sites.google.com/ucdavis.edu/mcallisterlab

A. Kimberley McAllister (born June 30, 1966) is an American cellular and molecular neuroscientist who specializes in synapse biology and neuroimmunology. She is director of a center for Neuroscience and a Professor of Neurology and Neurobiology, Physiology, and Behavior and the UC Davis Institute for Psychedelics and Neurotherapeutics.

== Early life and education ==
McAllister grew up in Great Falls, Virginia. She studied biology through internships with John Trott. McAllister pursued neurobiology research at Duke University in 1992 in the laboratory of Lawrence C. Katz.

== Academic career ==
McAllister was trained as a developmental neurobiologist by Lawrence C. Katz and Donald C. Lo and studied the role for neurotrophins in regulating dendritic growth of pyramidal neurons in the developing visual cortex. McAllister later refined her technique with later studies of how dendrites and neurons rely on the activity of the synapses. During that time, she adapted biolistic transfection for use in transfecting neurons in organotypic slices.

During the summer of 1998, she was a Grass Fellow in Neurophysiology at the Marine Biology Laboratory at Woods Hole.

Her team made discoveries about the initial mechanisms of synapse formation. Her lab also studies how "immune" molecules, such as major histocompatibility complex I molecules and cytokines, regulate the initial establishment of synaptic connections during brain development as well as contribute to synapse loss in Alzheimer's disease. McAllister's team has led efforts to improve reproducibility in rodent models of maternal immune activation (MIA). Through the interdisciplinary Conte Center that she co-directs, her group has identified biomarkers in female mice before pregnancy and following MIA during gestation that predict susceptibility and resilience to schizophrenia- and autism-related behavioral and neurochemical alterations in offspring.

In 2024 she was named as the inaugural Vice Provost for Research, Scholarly Inquiry, and Creative Activity at Wake Forest University in North Carolina.

== Service ==
In 2023 McAllister served on the finance committee for the Society for Neuroscience.

== Teaching ==
In 2018 McAllister had trained 10 pre-doctoral and 13 post-doctoral fellows. She has taught courses for both undergraduates and graduate students and she was the founding director of the UC Davis Learning, Memory, and Plasticity (LaMP) Training Program.

== Awards and honors ==
- Alfred P. Sloan Research Fellowship (2001–2003)
- John Merck Scholars Award (2003–2007)
- NARSAD Independent Investigator Award (2005–2007)
- Society for Neuroscience Young Investigator Award (2006)
- UC Davis Chancellor's Fellow Award (2007)
- UC Davis RISE (Research Investments in Science and Engineering) Award (2012)
- UC Davis Foundation Faculty and Staff Stewardship Award (2022)
