= Alexander Dogiel =

Russian histologist and neuroscientist (1852–1922)

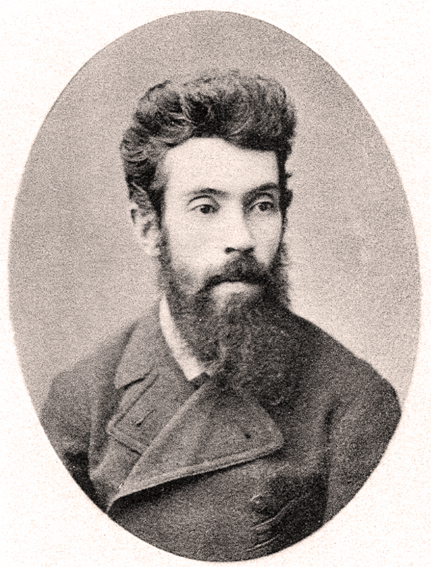
Alexander Dogiel (1852-1922), histologist, embryologist

Alexander Stanislavovich Dogiel or Dogel (Russian: Александр Станиславович Догель; 1852 in Panevėžys – 1922 in Saint Petersburg), was a Russian histologist and neuroscientist. He contributed to a morphological classification of nerve cells. The cells of Dogiel, bipolar neurons of the spinal ganglia, are named after him.

== Biography ==
Dogel studied at Kazan University where he graduated in 1883. He inaugurated his career in 1885 as a monitor in embryology. Then he taught and practiced histology, first in Tomsk from 1888, then in 1892 at the Saint Petersburg Medical Institute where he was entrusted with the organization of the histology laboratory. He founded the Russian Archives of Anatomy, Histology and Embryology (Russian: архив анатомии, гистологии и эмбриологии).

Dogel lived and worked in isolation, rarely but authoritatively publishing lengthy and richly illustrated articles. His work focused on degenerative and regenerative neuromuscular junction abnormalities, neuromuscular spindles, and various cellular categories within the central nervous system. He demonstrated a mastery of silver staining techniques and some of his illustrations contain a level of detail comparable to that which can be obtained using a low-power electronic microscope. He examined neurons and classified them based on their lengths, the shapes of dendrites, the positions of nuclei and their location within ganglia.

Dogel was an important figure in Russian histology. He trained Russian scientists such as Vladimir Bekhterev, Babukin, Yakulovich and Doinnikov in this specialty, but never went to visit his colleagues from Western Europe. His son Valentine Dogiel (1882-1955) became a parasitologist.

== Major works ==
- Die sensiblen Nervenendigungen im Herzen und in den Blutgefässen der Säugethiere. Archiv für Mikroskopische Anatomie 1898; 52: 44-70.
- Die Endigungen des sensiblen Nerven in den Augenmuskeln und deren Sehnen beim Menschen und den Saugietieren. Arch Mikr Anat 1906; 68 : 501-22.
- Der Bau der Spinalganglien des Menschen und der Säugetiere. Jena: Fischer, 1908
- Zur Frage über die Ganglien der Darmgeflechte bei den Säugetieren. Anat' Anz' 10:517–528. (1895)
- Dogiel, A.S. (1895). "Zur Frage über den feineren Bau des sympathischen Nervensystems bei den Säugethieren". Arch. Mikrosk. Anat. 46: 305–344. doi:10.1007/BF02906657. S2CID 83752217.
- Dogiel, A.S. (1896). "Zwei Arten sympathischer Nervenzellen". Anat. Anz. 11: 679–687.
- Dogiel, A.S. (1899). "Ueber den Bau der Ganglien in den Geflechten des Darmes und der Gallenblase des Menschen und der Säugethiere". Arch. Anat. Physiol. Leip. Anat. Abt.: 130–158.
