= Francesco Gennari =

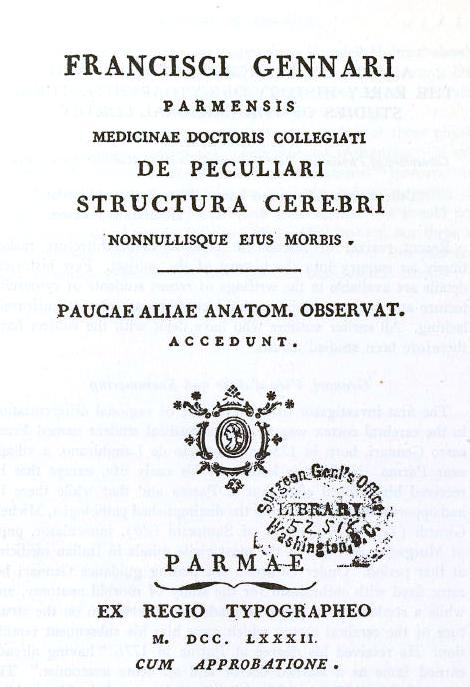
Front page of Gennari's book.

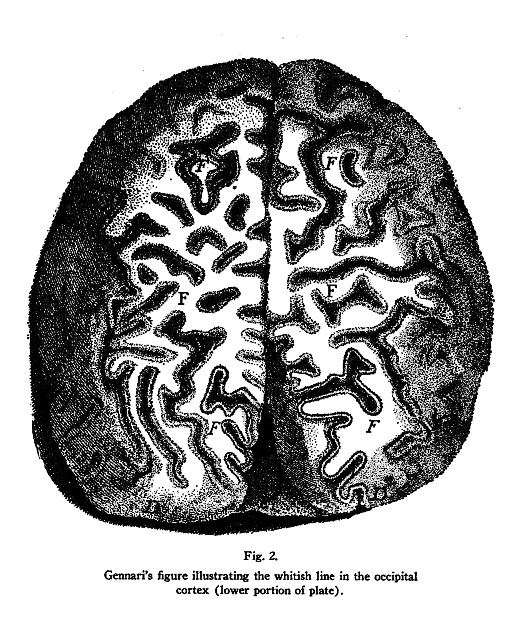
Illustration by Francesco Gennari showing his discovery.

Francesco Gennari (born 4 October 1750 Mattaleto di Langhirano; died 4 December 1797) was an Italian anatomist. He is known for line of Gennari, a macroscopically white band seen in the cerebral cortex of the occipital lobe, which he observed on 2 February 1776 in the course of examining ice-frozen sections of unstained human brain during his study in medical school. He mentioned it in his book De peculiari structura cerebri, nonnulisque ejus morbis (1782), and referred to it as lineola albidior.

None of the anatomists I happened to read have taught that in addition to the cortical and medullary substance there is in the brain another substance which I am accustomed to call the third substance of this organ. ... it can be found with difficulty or it is somewhat obscure in the anterior part of the brain, but it can be detected more and more clearly in the posterior part of the brain.

The discovery of this part of the brain is considered the first evidence that the cerebral cortex was not uniform in structure.

Gennari attended medical school in Parma and received a medical degree in 1776. His life declined thereafter, as Gennari became a compulsive gambler, and ultimately died penniless and in relative obscurity.
