= Dogiel cells =

Type of multipolar nerve cell

Cells of Dogiel
- Cells of Dogiel can be seen within a spinal ganglion

Dogiel cells, also known as cells of Dogiel, are a type of multipolar neuronal cells within the prevertebral sympathetic ganglia. They are named after the Russian anatomist and physiologist Alexandre Dogiel (1852–1922). Dogiel cells play a role in the enteric nervous system.

== Types ==
There are seven types of cells of Dogiel.
