= Mathematical Neuroscience Prize =

The Mathematical Neuroscience Prize is a prize awarded biennially since 2013 by the nonprofit organization Israel Brain Technologies (IBT). It is endowed with $100,000 for each laureate and honors researchers who have significantly advanced the understanding of the neural mechanisms of perception, behavior and thought through the application of mathematical analysis and modeling.

== Laureates ==
- 2013 Larry Abbott (Columbia University) and Haim Sompolinsky (Hebrew University Jerusalem)
- 2015 Nancy Kopell (Boston University) and Bard Ermentrout (University of Pittsburgh)
- 2017 Fred Wolf (Max Planck Institute for Dynamics and Self-Organization) and Misha Tsodyks (Weizmann Institute of Science)
- 2019 Naftali Tishby (Hebrew University) and John Rinzel (New York University)

== See also ==
- The Brain Prize
- The Kavli Prize
- The Mind & Brain Prize
- List of mathematics awards
- List of neuroscience awards
