= Rhabdosphincter =

Sphincter consisting of striated muscle fibres

A rhabdosphincter (from Greek rhabdos meaning "rod") is a sphincter consisting of striated muscle fibres. The muscle is a part of the external urethral sphincter that continues superiorly as a trough-like extension running vertically across the anterior aspect of the prostate to reach the neck of the bladder.
