= Gerry Downes =

American biologist

Gerald "Gerry" Downes is an associate professor in biology at the University of Massachusetts, Amherst. His research expertise is in the genetic requirements for zebrafish swimming. Recently he has expanded his research interests into using the zebrafish system to model idiopathic (unknown cause) epilepsy syndromes.

== Career history ==
Downes received his bachelor's degree in biology at Johnson C. Smith University in Charlotte, North Carolina, and his PhD in neuroscience with Narasimhan Gautam at Washington University in St. Louis, Missouri. He then moved to Philadelphia and performed a postdoctoral fellowship with Michael Granato at the University of Pennsylvania between 1999 and 2005. He started as an assistant professor of biology at the University of Massachusetts Amherst in 2005, and was promoted to associate professor in 2012.

== Research ==
During his postdoctoral fellowship Downes started to work with the zebrafish (Danio rerio) model system. Zebrafish make a great model organism for neuroscience research because they develop quickly and are transparent so their brains and brain development can be easily observed. Furthermore, there are considerable similarity in the genes and pathways involved in brain development between humans and zebrafish. As a postdoctoral fellow, Downes helped develop a method, stochastic labeling, to track the development of individual neurons in intact zebrafish using green fluorescent protein (GFP), which is essential for understanding how neurons grow directionally and form connections in the nervous system. He also started to work on a class of zebrafish mutants that exhibit abnormal swimming behaviors that were isolated from a previous genetic screen. When he started work on this project the identities of the underlying genes weren't known. However, his work showed that mutations in the neurotransmitter-degrading enzyme acetylcholinesterase cause abnormal swimming behavior in one line of mutant zebrafish. In collaboration with John Kuwada's laboratory at the University of Michigan, they also discovered mutations in a zebrafish glycine receptor underlie abnormal swimming in another line of zebrafish

At the University of Massachusetts, Downes continued his work on zebrafish mutants that exhibit abnormal swimming behavior. His group identified mutations in a muscle cell calcium pump critical for muscle relaxation, a mitochondrial enzyme required to break down a subset of amino acids, and a neurotransmitter transporter from three different lines of zebrafish mutants. These zebrafish mutants parallel and serve as new animal models for Brody's Disease, a severe muscle weakness disorder; Maple Syrup Urine Disease, a metabolic disorder that can cause severe neurological damage, and a generalized epilepsy disorder.

Downes is continuing to lead a team of researchers at the University of Massachusetts, who focus on determining the genes and neural networks involved in movement. Downes' laboratory is also working to better understand and developing new treatments for epilepsies.
