= Valerie Wojna =

American medical researcher

- Born: Valerie E. Wojna Muñiz
- Education: University of Puerto Rico School of Medicine (MD)
- Scientific career
- Fields: Neurology
- Workplaces: University of Puerto Rico, Medical Sciences Campus

Valerie E. Wojna Muñiz is a Puerto Rican neurologist and professor of neurology at University of Puerto Rico, Medical Sciences Campus.

== Education ==
Wojna graduated from University of Puerto Rico School of Medicine (UPR) in 1984. At UPR, she completed an internship in internal medicine (1985), a residency in neurology (1988), and a fellowship in clinical neurophysiology (1990).

== Career ==
Wojna is a professor of neurology at the University of Puerto Rico, where she researches neurologic disorders, insulin resistance, and Human Immunodeficiency Virus (HIV) associated neurocognitive disorder (HAND). With immunologist Loyda M. Meléndez, Wojna used proteomics to research the causes of HAND.

Wojna has also combined some of her interests; for example with collaborators she has investigated insulin resistance in HIV patients, and she is part of a study that looks for a "comparison between the cognitive damage caused by the virus between women and men in Puerto Rico."

Her research has documented the neurocognitive damage resulting from chronic infections traced to HIV in Puerto Rican women, and the local scientific community has collaborated with researchers at the University of Hawaii looking for effective new drugs to help patients.

"The scientific mission of these laboratories led by Dr. Wojna is to provide a new medical alternative that avoids the effects of chronic infection on the neurocognitive health of this population.

In addition to preventing chronic infections that can impact the neurocognitive health of Puerto Rican women, Wojna has also researched the impact of sex hormones and oxidative stress.

In 2001, she was elected a Fellow of the American Academy of Neurology.

== Selected publications ==
- Wojna, V., Skolasky, R. L., Hechavarría, R., Mayo, R., Selnes, O., McArthur, J. C., ... & Nath, A. (2006). Prevalence of human immunodeficiency virus-associated cognitive impairment in a group of Hispanic women at risk for neurological impairment. Journal of neurovirology, 12(5), 356-364.
- Wojna, V., Robles, L., Skolasky, R. L., Mayo, R., Selnes, O., de la Torre, T., ... & Lasalde-Dominicci, J. (2007). Associations of cigarette smoking with viral immune and cognitive function in human immunodeficiency virus-seropositive women. Journal of neurovirology, 13(6), 561-568.
- Gerena, Y., Skolasky, R. L., Velez, J. M., Toro-Nieves, D., Mayo, R., Nath, A., & Wojna, V. (2012). Soluble and cell-associated insulin receptor dysfunction correlates with severity of HAND in HIV-infected women. PLoS One, 7(5), e37358.
- Morales, D., Acevedo, S. F., Skolasky, R. L., Hechavarria, R., Santiago, S., De La Torre, T., ... & Wojna, V. (2012). Translational spatial task and its relationship to HIV-associated neurocognitive disorders and apolipoprotein E in HIV-seropositive women. Journal of neurovirology, 18(6), 488-502.
- Cantres-Rosario, Y., Plaud-Valentín, M., Gerena, Y., Skolasky, R. L., Wojna, V., & Meléndez, L. M. (2013). Cathepsin B and cystatin B in HIV-seropositive women are associated with infection and HIV-1-associated neurocognitive disorders. AIDS, 27(3), 347.
- Victorson, D., Cavazos, J. E., Holmes, G. L., Reder, A. T., Wojna, V., Nowinski, C., ... & Cella, D. (2014). Validity of the Neurology Quality-of-Life (Neuro-QoL) measurement system in adult epilepsy. Epilepsy & Behavior, 31, 77-84.
