= Jane Rylett =

Canadian molecular neurobiologist

Academic background
- Education: B.Sc., Physiology and Pharmacology, PhD, Pharmacology University of Western Ontario
- Thesis: Actions of choline mustard aziridinium ion at the cholinergic nerve terminal

Rebecca Jane Rylett FCAHS is a Canadian molecular neurobiologist. As of 2019, she is the Scientific Director of the CIHR Institute of Aging. As a Distinguished University Professor at the University of Western Ontario, Rylett also served as an Associate Dean in the Schulich School of Medicine & Dentistry and chair of the Department of Physiology and Pharmacology.

== Early life and education ==
She completed her Bachelor of Science degree in physiology and pharmacology and PhD in pharmacology at the University of Western Ontario (UWO). As a graduate student, she became involved in drug trials in Alzheimer patients as part of the cellular – mechanistic studies of her thesis research.

== Career ==
Following her PhD, Rylett trained in neurophysiology at University College London and neurochemistry at the Max Planck Institute for Biophysical Chemistry before being recruited to join the faculty at Schulich School of Medicine & Dentistry as the Rubinoff Scholar in Geriatrics. Upon joining the faculty, Rylett helped establish the Graduate Program in Neurosciences at UWO and served as its Director from 1994 to 2000. She was then appointed chair of the Department of Physiology and Pharmacology and co-director of the Molecular Brain Research Group at the Robarts Research Institute. While serving in these roles, Rylett also chaired the Institute Advisory Board of the Canadian Institutes of Health Research (CIHR) Institute of Aging and chaired grant review panels for the Ontario Mental Health Foundation. In 2013, Rylett was elected a Fellow of the Canadian Academy of Health Sciences and promoted to the rank of Distinguished University Professor. She was later extended as Chair of the Department of Physiology and Pharmacology to June 30, 2017 and named among 15 College of Reviewers Chairs by the CIHR.

Prior to the 2017–18 academic year, Rylett was appointed Associate Dean and Director, Animal Research Facilities at the Schulich School of Medicine & Dentistry. In 2019, Rylett was appointed the Scientific Director of the CIHR Institute of Aging. Following this appointment, Rylett continued to develop research opportunities to promote healthy aging and hosted the Institute at the Robarts Research Institute.
