= Hippocampus (journal) =

- Discipline: Neuroscience
- Language: English
- Edited by: Michael E. Hasselmo

Publication details
- History: 1991-present
- Publisher: John Wiley & Sons
- Frequency: Monthly
- Impact factor: 3.899 (2020)

Standard abbreviations
- ISO 4: Hippocampus

Indexing
- CODEN: HIPPEL
- ISSN: 1050-9631 (print); 1098-1063 (web)
- LCCN: 99112116
- OCLC no.: 798858258

Links
- Journal homepage; Online access; Online archive

Hippocampus is a monthly peer-reviewed scientific journal established in 1991. It is published by John Wiley & Sons and covers the neurobiology of the hippocampal formation and related structures. The founding editors-in-chief were David Amaral and Menno Witter, who were succeeded in 1998 by Howard Eichenbaum (Boston University), who remained in this position until he died in 2017.

== Abstracting and indexing ==
The journal is abstracted and indexed by:

- Biological Abstracts
- BIOSIS Previews
- Chemical Abstracts Service
- Current Contents/Life Sciences
- Embase/Excerpta Medica
- Index Medicus/MEDLINE/PubMed
- ProQuest databases
- PsycINFO/Psychological Abstracts
- Science Citation Index
- Scopus

According to the Journal Citation Reports, the journal has a 2020 impact factor of 3.899.
