= Johannes Thome =

German psychiatrist

Johannes Thome the Director and Chair of the Clinic and Policlinic of Psychiatry and Psychotherapy, Rostock University, Germany, and Honorary Professor at The School of Medicine, Swansea University, Wales, UK.

== Biography ==
Thome studied medicine, philosophy and social psychology and obtained his M.D. and Ph.D. degrees from Saarland University, Germany. He completed his training in psychiatry at the University of Würzburg, Germany, and then became postdoctoral associate at the Division of Molecular Psychiatry from the Yale School of Medicine, United States. After two years of intensive and successful research in the area of molecular psychiatry and psychopharmacology, he worked as consultant psychiatrist and senior lecturer at the Central Institute of Mental Health Mannheim, University of Heidelberg, Germany. From 2004 till 2011, he was chair of psychiatry at the Institute of Life Sciences, Swansea University, Swansea, Wales. In March 2011, he was appointed head of the Department of Psychiatry and Psychotherapy at the University of Rostock, Germany; there, besides the treatment of mental illness, he wishes to create a new center of molecular psychiatry.

== Work ==
His research interests focus on what happens in the brain at cellular, genetic and molecular levels when psychiatric disorders break out (e.g. depression, psychoses, adult ADHD, dementia), psychopharmacology and interdisciplinary aspects of psychiatry, including psychopathology and philosophy. Prof. Thome has authored and co-authored several books and more than 100 articles in international scientific journals. He is member of the Editorial Board of several scientific journals and a regular reviewer of manuscripts in the fields of psychiatry and neuroscience, as well as of grant applications for several national research councils.

Thome is the Secretary General of the World Federation of ADHD and was member of the Executive Committee of the UK Adult ADHD Network.

== Books ==
- "Philosophy and Psychiatry" (ISBN 3110178001)
- "Molekulare Psychiatrie" (ISBN 3456835035)
- "Psychotherapeutische Aspekte in der Philosophie Platons (Altertumswissenschaftliche Texte und Studien)" (ISBN 3487099888)
