= Erich Schröger =

German neuroscientist (born 1958)

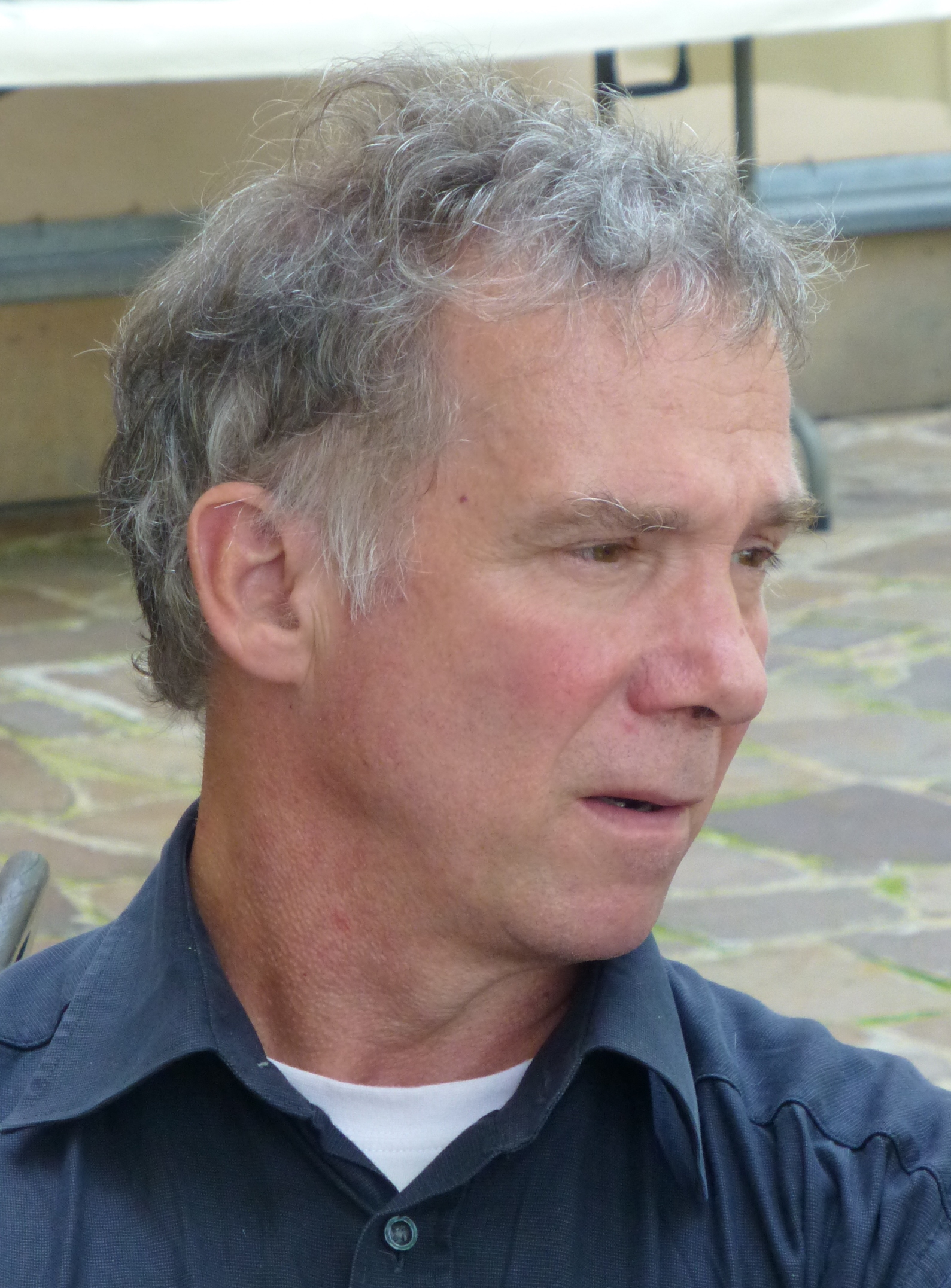
- Erich Schröger, 2014
- Born: 11 November 1958 (age 67); Munich, Germany
- Education: LMU Munich
- Awards: Distinguished Scientific Award for Early Career – Contribution to Psychophysiology from the Society for Psychophysiological Research (1996); Fellow of the Review Board for Psychology within the Deutsche Forschungsgemeinschaft (the German Research Foundation, DFG, 2004-2011); Member of the Selection Committee for the Allocation of Alexander von Humboldt Foundation research awards (2012-); Named among the 50 most influential living psychologists in the world (2018)
- Scientific career
- Fields: Cognitive neuroscience, psychology
- Workplaces: University of Leipzig
- Academic advisors: Kurt Müller; Risto Näätänen; Wolfgang Prinz

Erich Schröger (born 11 November 1958, in Munich) is a German psychologist and neuroscientist.

== Biography ==
Erich Schröger studied philosophy and psychology in Munich at the Munich School of Philosophy and LMU Munich. In 1982, he earned a Baccalaureat in Philosophy, in 1986 he earned a Diploma in Psychology, and in 1991 he was awarded a PhD from LMU Munich for his work on loudness constancy. After research stays at the Cognitive Brain Research unit of the University of Helsinki (Finland) and a stint of teaching at the Catholic University of Eichstätt-Ingolstadt (Germany), Schröger achieved his Habilitation in psychology in 1996 at LMU.

In 1997, Schröger was appointed to the University of Leipzig as a professor of Biological Psychology. Since 2001 he has held its Chair of Cognitive and Biological Psychology and has been the Head of the research group BioCog. In 2017, Schröger became Vice Rector for Research and Young Academics.

From 1999 to 2002, Schröger served as Vice-Dean of the Faculty for Biological Sciences, Pharmacy, and Psychology at the University of Leipzig. From 2014 to 2016, he was Dean of the Faculty. Schröger's other service roles at the university include: from 2002 to 2004, Director of the Institute for General Psychology; from 2003 to 2004, Head of the Psychological Institutes; in 2005 and from 2010 to 2013, Dean for Study Affairs in Psychology.

== Research ==
Schröger's main fields of research include perception, attention, and memory. He usually works in audition, but he also investigates visual and multimodal mechanisms of human information processing. Among other scientific contributions, he has developed an experimental paradigm for assessing the mechanisms of automatic distraction of attention by changes of task-irrelevant stimulus information. Contributing to the work of the Finnish psychologist Risto Näätänen, Schröger has described important processes on which the detection of violations in regular stimulus sequences is based. For example, he was able to show that such automatic change detection involves both sensory adaptation processes and cognitive comparison processes of sensory memory. Furthermore, Schröger is interested in the History and Methods of Psychology.

As of April 2022, Schröger had published more than 400 scientific papers, book chapters, and books and been an honorary reviewer for more than 100 scientific journals and organizations.

== Grants ==
Schröger has received more than 15 grants from German Research Council (DFG), more than five grants from the DAAD, and several EU-projects.

In December 2008, Schröger won a one-million-Euro, five-year Reinhart Koselleck Project Grant by the DFG. The main research issue of this project was the mechanism of predictive modeling in audition. Specifically, Schröger investigated how automatic predictions about upcoming auditory events can be generated on the basis of regular environmental stimulation. Due to this mechanism, for example, incoming acoustic stimuli can be processed with astonishing speed as when comprehending spoken language or localizing moving sounds. Likewise, the specific processing of self-induced auditory stimuli—stimuli that a person creates by means of its own behavior—can be explained by the principles of predictive modeling. In order to optimize a predictive model, the information processing system calculates predictive errors as the difference between the prediction and the actual stimulus signal.

== Honours ==
For his scientific work, Schröger received the 1996 Distinguished Scientific Award for Early Career – Contribution to Psychophysiology from the Society for Psychophysiological Research (SPR). From 2004 to 2011, he was a Fellow of the Review Board for Psychology within the DFG, Since 2012 he has been a member of the Selection Committee for the Allocation of Alexander von Humboldt Foundation research awards.

In January 2018, Schröger was named among the 50 most influential living psychologists in the world.
