= Ventral supraoptic decussation =

Crossover point of eye nerves

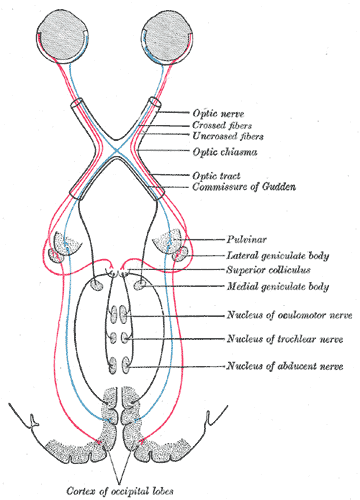
- Scheme showing central connections of the optic nerves and optic tracts. (Commissure of Gudden labeled at center right.)

Details

Identifiers
- Latin: commissura supraoptica ventralis
- NeuroNames: 389
- NeuroLex ID: birnlex_1347
- TA98: A14.1.08.959
- TA2: 5761
- FMA: 62052

The ventral supraoptic decussation is the crossover (decussation) point for signals from the left and right eye, en route respectively to the right and left sides of the visual cortex.

Occupying the posterior part of the commissure of the optic chiasma is a strand of fibers, the Ventral supraoptic decussation (commissure of Gudden, Gudden's inferior commissure), which is not derived from the optic nerves; it forms a connecting link between the medial geniculate bodies.
