= Bronislaw Onuf-Onufrowicz =

American anatomist

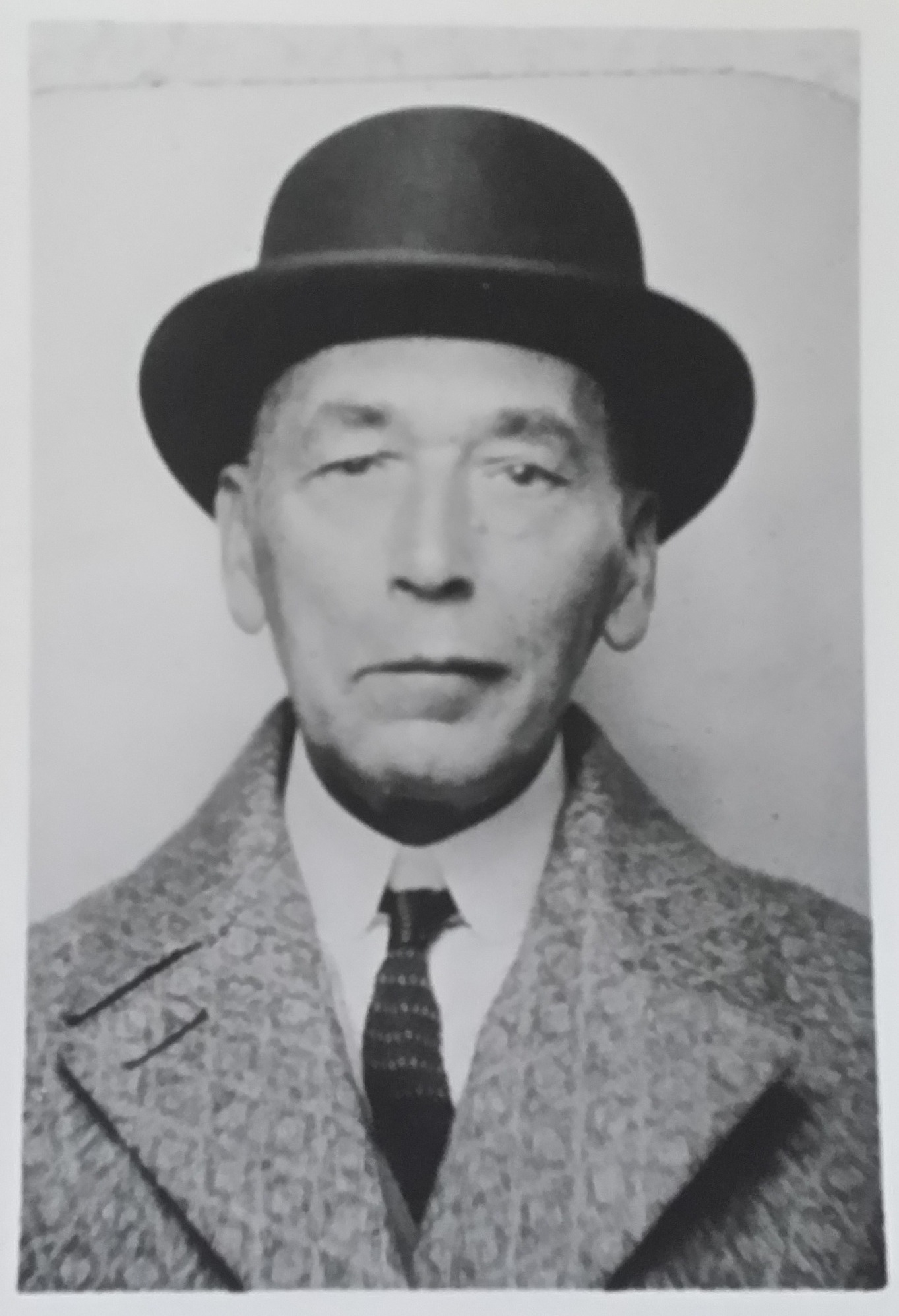
- Born: July 4, 1863; Yeniseysk, Russian Empire
- Died: December 29, 1928 (aged 65); Rutherford, New Jersey
- Occupation: Neurologist
- Known for: Onuf's nucleus

Bronislaw Onuf-Onufrowicz (July 4, 1863 in – December 29, 1928 in Rutherford, New Jersey) was a Russian-born American neurologist of Polish descent.

He was born in Yeniseysk, Russia, in 1863, as the son of the physician Adam Onufrowicz and Maria. He attended Industrieschule Zürich and later studied medicine at the Zurich University. He was a pupil of August Forel. Circa 1890 he emigrated to USA. He worked in Pathological Institute of NY State Hospitals under the directorship of Ira Van Gieson and later became lecturer in NY Polyclinic. From 1899, he worked in St. Catherine Hospital, NY. Later he practised in Craig Colony for Epileptics in Sonyea, NY. In the 1920s, he was a consulting neurologist at U.S. Marine Hospital 43, located on Ellis Island. He was a member and vice-president of New York Psychoanalytic Society, member of American Neurological Association (since 1895), secretary and vice-president of the New York Neurological Society.

He is best known for his discovery of group of neurons in spinal cord, Onuf's nucleus.

== Selected works ==
- Forel, A; Onufrowicz, B (1885). "Weitere Mittheilung über den Ursprung des Nervus acusticus". Neurologisches Centralblatt. 9 (4): 193–194.
- Onufrowicz, Br. (1885). "Experimenteller Beitrag zur Kenntniss des Ursprungs des Nervus acusticus des Kaninchens". Archiv für Psychiatrie und Nervenkrankheiten. 16 (3): 711–742. doi:10.1007/BF02057570. S2CID 28940685.
- "The Warding-Off Neuropsychoses". Journal of Nervous & Mental Disease. 2 (20): 129. 1895.
- "The Biological and Morphological Constitution of Ganglionic Cells, as Influenced by Section of the Spinal Nerve Roots of Spinal Nerves". The Journal of Nervous and Mental Disease. 20 (10): 597. 1895. doi:10.1097/00005053-189510000-00001.
- Onuf (Onufrowicz), B. (1897). "A Study in Aphasia". Journal of Nervous & Mental Disease. 24 (2): 86–97. doi:10.1097/00005053-189702000-00002.
- "'". Journal of Nervous & Mental Disease. 24 (12): 782. December 1897. doi:10.1097/00005053-189712000-00009.
- Onuf, B; Collins, J (1898). "Experimental Researches on the Localisation of the Symphatethic Nerve in the Spinal Cord and Brain, and contribution to its Physiology". The Journal of Nervous and Mental Disease. 25 (9): 661. doi:10.1097/00005053-189809000-00002. S2CID 144662696.
- Onuf, B. (1899). "Notes on the Arrangement and Function of the Cell Groups in the Sacral Region of the Spinal Cord". Journal of Nervous & Mental Disease. 26 (8): 498–504. doi:10.1097/00005053-189908000-00006. S2CID 147602936.
- "On the arrangement and function of the cell groups of the sacral region of the spinal cord in man". Archives of Neurology & Psychopathology. 3 (3): 387–413. 1900.
- Onuf, B; Collins, J (1900). "Experimental Researches on the Localisation of the Symphatethic Nerve in the Spinal Cord and Brain, and Contribution to Its Physiology". Archives of Neurology & Psychopathology. 3 (3).
- "The differential diagnosis of multiple sclerosis". Brooklyn Medical Journal. 16: 483–487. 1902.
- Pilcher, LS; Onuf, B (1903). "VI. Perforating Gunshot Wound of the Cervical Portion of the Spinal Cord. Report of a Case in which Recovery was secured, with Ability to Walk". Annals of Surgery. 38 (6): 812–24. PMC 1431421. PMID 17861394.
- Onuf, B (1904). "Note on a Stain applicable to Differential Leucocyte Counts in the Counting Chamber". J Med Res. 12 (1): 87–93. PMC 2099879. PMID 19971630.
- "A Method for Securing Fixation and Hardening of the Central Nervous System before the Autopsy". Medical Record. 2 (66): 52–55. 1904.
- "On the Association of Epilepsy with Muscular Conditions Fitting Best into the Cadre of the Myopathies". Trans Amer Neurol Assoc. 31: 240–255. 1905.
- Onuf, B; Lograsso, H (1906). "Researches on the Blood of Epileptics". Am J Med Sci. 131 (2): 269–285. doi:10.1097/00000441-190602000-00011.
- "Demonstration of A New Method of Brain Reconstruction". Journal of Nervous & Mental Disease. 11 (35): 712. 1907.
- Onuf, B. (1909). "Dreams and Their Interpretation as Diagnostic and Therapeutic Aids in Psychopathology". The Journal of Abnormal Psychology. 4 (6): 339–350. doi:10.1037/h0071627.
- "Some Features of the Epileptic Attack". New York Med J. 78: 871. 1913.
- "On the Role of Masturbation, Especially as Applied to Some Psychoses". Urologic and Cutaneous Review. 21 (10): 562–570. 1917.
- "Frederick Chopin's Mental Makeup". Dementia Praecox Studies. 3 (1–2): 199–204. 1920.
