= Interoception =

Sensory system that receives and integrates information from the body

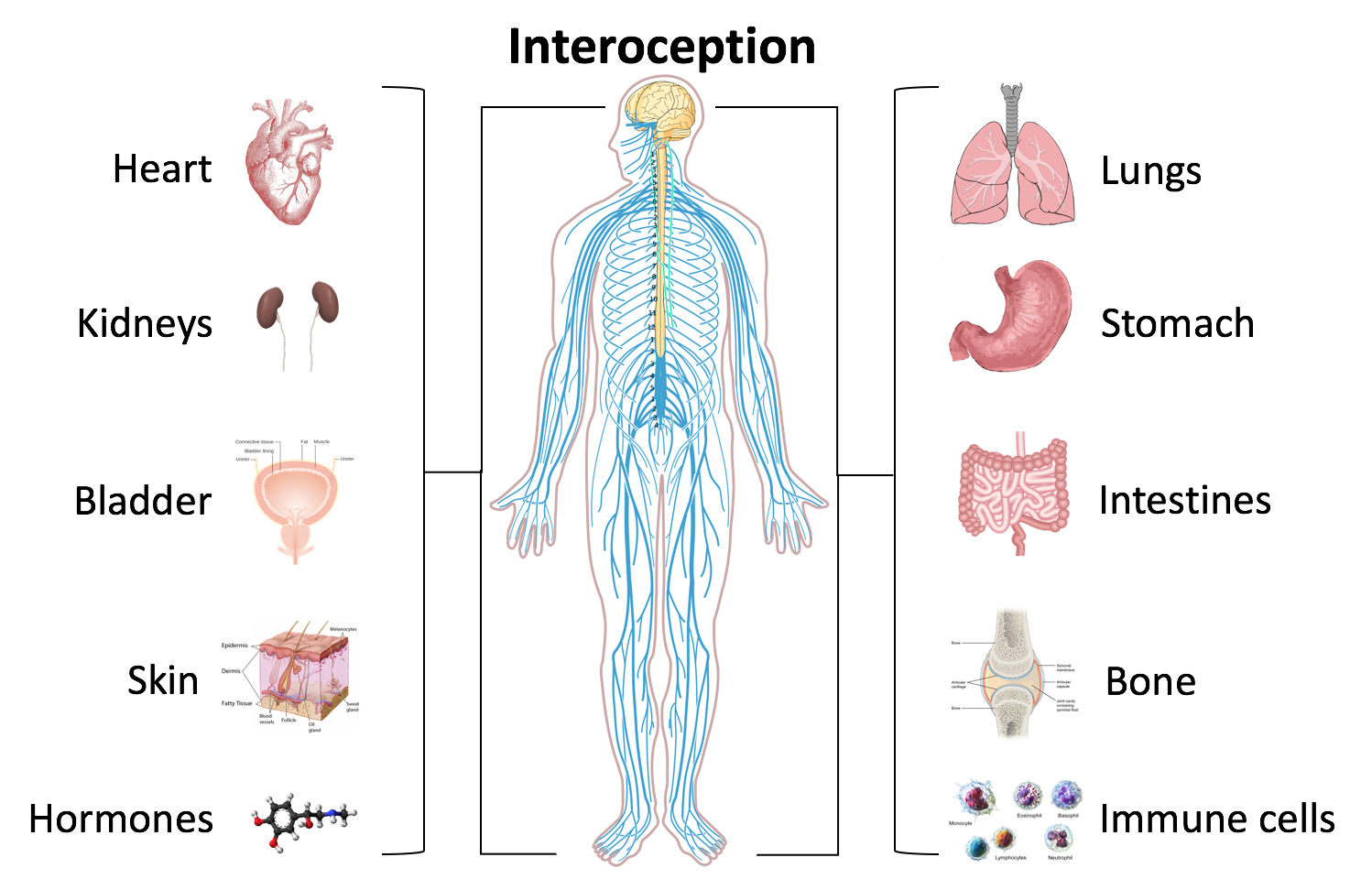
Interoception is involved in many different physiological systems like the cardiorespiratory system, gastrointestinal system, nociceptive system, endocrine and immune systems.

The sensory system that allows organisms to sense internal stimuli. This includes sensing: hunger, thirst, lung expansion/contraction and many other internal stimuli.

Interoception is the collection of senses providing information to the organism about the internal state of the body. This can be both conscious and subconscious. It encompasses the brain's process of integrating signals relayed from the body into specific subregions—like the brainstem, thalamus, insula, somatosensory, and anterior cingulate cortex—allowing for a complex and highly accurate representation of the physiological state of the body. This is important for maintaining homeostatic conditions in the body and, potentially, facilitating self-awareness.

Interoceptive signals are projected to the brain via a diversity of neural pathways, in particular from the lamina I of the spinal cord along the spinothalamic pathway and through the projections of the solitary nucleus, that allow for the sensory processing and prediction of internal bodily states. Misrepresentations of internal states, or a disconnect between the body's signals and the brain's interpretation and prediction of those signals, have been suggested to underlie conditions such as anxiety, depression, panic disorder, anorexia nervosa, bulimia nervosa, posttraumatic stress disorder (PTSD), obsessive compulsive disorder (OCD), attention deficit hyperactivity disorder (ADHD), alexithymia, somatic symptom disorder, and illness anxiety disorder.

The contemporary definition of interoception is not synonymous with the term "visceroception". Visceroception refers to the perception of bodily signals arising specifically from the viscera: the heart, lungs, stomach, and bladder, along with other internal organs in the trunk of the body. This does not include organs like the brain and skin. Interoception encompasses visceral signaling, but more broadly relates to all physiological tissues that relay a signal to the central nervous system about the current state of the body. Interoceptive signals are transmitted to the brain via multiple pathways including the lamina I spinothalamic pathway, the classical viscerosensory pathway, the vagus nerve and glossopharyngeal nerve, chemosensory pathways in the blood, and somatosensory pathways from the skin.

Interoceptive signals arise from many different physiological systems of the body. The most commonly studied system is cardiovascular interoception which is typically measured by directing attention towards the sensation of the heartbeat during various tasks. Other physiological systems integral to interoceptive processing include the respiratory system, gastrointestinal and genitourinary systems, nociceptive system, thermoregulatory system, endocrine and immune systems. Soft cutaneous touch is another sensory signal often included within the interoceptive processing system.

== History and etymology ==
=== Early to mid-1900s ===
The concept of interoception was introduced in 1906 by the Nobel Laureate Sir Charles S. Sherrington. He did not use the noun interoception, but did describe as interoceptive those receptors that are within the viscera—what are today called "visceroceptive"—and thus excluded all other receptors and information from the body, which he grouped as either exteroceptive or proprioceptive. In Sherrington's model, exteroceptive receptors were those that received information from outward stimuli, like light, touch, sound, and odor. He classified temperature and nociception as exteroceptive sensations as well, though these are now regarded as having interoceptive qualities. He further divided the internal milieu of the body by its somatic and autonomic functions. And proprioceptors were those found in skeletal tissue that control voluntary movement. For him, interoceptors (a term which has lost prevalence in modern literature) were thus confined to visceral involuntary smooth muscle (e.g. surrounding blood vessels).

Further work on interoceptive processing after Sherrington was delayed for many years owing to the influential claim by John Newport Langley that the autonomic nervous system used only efferent (brain-to-body) signaling to implement its functions. By the 1950s and 1960s, many investigations of interoceptive processing had been conducted, and once it had become apparent that interoceptive receptors are present in many tissues of the body other researchers began to investigate afferent body-to-brain signals, mainly by conducting animal experiments to see if interoceptive conditioning was possible. Using principles of Pavlovian conditioning, different physiological systems in dogs were perturbed to elicit a conditioned response to food.

For example, in one experiment, dogs' pelvises were distended using infusions of solution when food was presented to them. After rounds of pairing the two, salivation occurred without presenting food once the pelvis was distended. Interoceptive conditioning studies like this illustrated that interoceptive sensations may be important for learned behavior and emotion.

=== Mid-1900s to 2000 ===
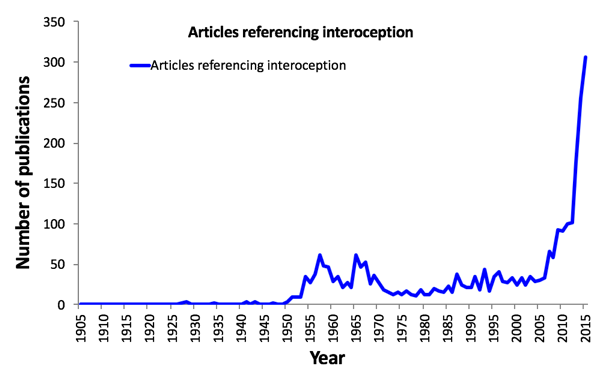
This graph shows the number of articles that reference the term "interoception" specifically from 1905 to 2015. A clear increase in the number of publications per year on the topic is seen in the 21st century.

The increased interest in interoception during the late 1950s and the 1960s, as evidenced by the number of papers published, has been referred to as the "biofeedback blip". This was a phase during which many researchers examined humans' ability to gain control over autonomic functions as a method of treatment for various conditions.

Interoception did not gain widespread popularity within the scientific community until the mid- to late-twentieth century. During that period, some researchers chose to use the terms visceroceptor and interoceptor interchangeably, in line with Sherrington's usage, others combined proprioceptive and visceroceptive information into one category—interoception—based on physiological data about the lack of differences in nerve impulses, and still others proposed that interoception includes more than just endogenous (internal) stimuli. Exactly which sensory signals could or should be classified as interoceptive remains the subject of ongoing debate.

During the 1980s, psychophysiologists began to extensively examine cardiovascular interoception, introducing several different experimental tasks for studying the perception of the heartbeat: heartbeat counting, heartbeat tapping, and heartbeat detection. Psychiatrists also began to look at the effects of pharmacological stimulation on the symptoms of panic disorder. All of this further increased researchers' interest in interoception, including the development of theoretical models of the integration of interoceptive information within the body over time.

=== 2000 and on ===
The twenty-first century has seen a tremendous increase in publications on the topic of interoception, and to a recognition of its multifaceted nature. This has led to the emergence of different ideas about interoception. One contemporary definition widens the concept to encompass "the skin and all that is underneath the skin" and the perception and function of bodily activity to more fully understand psychosomatic processes. In a similar vein, neuroanatomists hoping to find the anatomical basis of interoceptive functioning have stated the existence of a homeostatic pathway from the body to the brain that represents "the physiological status of all tissues in the body," and that this mapping onto the brain provides an individual with subjective feeling states that are critical for human emotion and self-awareness.

For example, interoception is the fundament of the modern view on allostasis and allostatic load. The regulatory model of allostasis claims that the brain's primary role as an organ is the predictive regulation of internal sensations. Predictive regulation is the brain's ability to anticipate needs and prepare to fulfill them before they arise. In this model, the brain is responsible for efficient regulation of its internal milieu.

Interoception is sometimes generally referred to as "the perception of internal body states" although there are many interoceptive processes that are not consciously perceived. Importantly, interoception is made possible through a process of "integrating the information coming from inside the body into the central nervous system". This definition deviates from Sherrington's original proposition, but exemplifies the dynamic and widening breadth of interoception as a concept in modern literature.

== Facets of interoception ==
Different facets or components of interoception
Facet	Operational definition
Attention	Observing internal body sensations
Detection	Presence or absence of conscious report
Magnitude	Intensity
Discrimination	Localize sensation to a specific channel or organ system, and differentiate it from other sensations
Accuracy (or sensitivity)	Correct and precise monitoring
Self-Report	Reflect upon one's own experiences of interoceptive states, make judgements about their outcomes, and describe them through verbal or motor responses

Although interoception as a term has more recently gained increased popularity, different aspects of it have been studied since the 1950s. These include the features of attention, detection, magnitude, discrimination, accuracy, sensibility, and self-reporting. Despite not using the word interoception specifically, many publications in the physiology and medical fields have focused on understanding interoceptive information processing in different organ systems. Attention describes the ability to observe sensations within the body, it can be directed voluntarily in a "top down" manner or it can be attracted involuntarily in a "bottom up" manner.

Detection reflects the presence or absence of a conscious report of interoceptive stimuli, like a heartbeat or growling stomach. Magnitude is the intensity of the stimulus, or how strongly the stimuli is felt. Discrimination describes the ability to localize interoceptive stimuli in the body to specific organs and differentiate them from other bodily stimuli that also occur, like distinguishing between a heart which is beating hard from an upset stomach. Accuracy (or sensitivity) refers to how precisely and correctly an individual can monitor specific interoceptive processes.

Self-reporting is itself multifaceted. It describes the ability to reflect on interoceptive experiences occurring over different periods of time, make judgments about them, and describe them. Brain-body interactions can also be studied using neuroimaging techniques to map functional interactions between brain and peripheral signals. Although all of these components of interoception have been studied since the mid-twentieth century, they have not been brought together under the umbrella term "interoception" until more recently.

The term "interoceptive awareness" is also frequently used to encompass any (or all) of the different interoception features that are accessible to conscious self-report. This multifaceted approach offers a unified way of looking at interoceptive functioning and its different features, it clarifies the definition of interoception itself, and it informs structured ways of assessing interoceptive experiences in an individual.

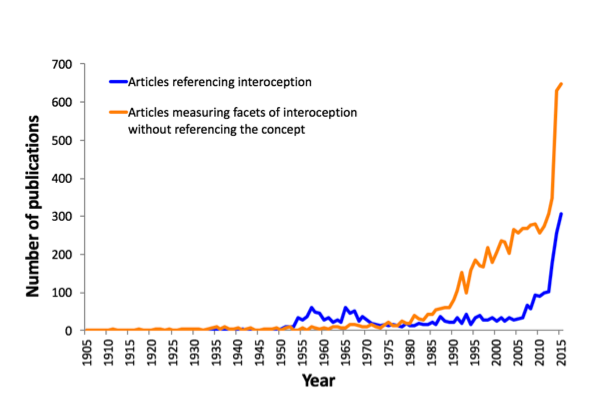
This graph shows the number of articles published on interoception vs. articles published on interoceptive facets without directly referencing the term from 1905 to 2015. The timeline starts one year before the publication of Charles Sherrington's book, The integrative action of the nervous system, which introduced "interoception".

== Interoceptive physiology ==
=== Cardiovascular system ===
Cardiovascular interoception assessment by facet.
Construct	Task				
Attention	X	X	X	X	X
Detection			X	X	X
Discrimination				X	X
Intensity					X
Accuracy		X	X	X	X
Self Report	X	X	X	X	X
Developed by	Simmons; 2013	Schandry; 1981	Ludwick- Rosenthal; 1985	Whitehead; Brener; Katkin	Khalsa; 2009

Cardiac interoception has been widely studied as a method of evaluating interoceptive sensation. This is done using different tasks including heartbeat counting, heartbeat tapping, heartbeat detection and heartbeat attention tasks. Heartbeat counting tasks ask participants to count the number of felt heartbeats during short time periods. Their reported count is then compared with the actual count obtained with an electrocardiogram. This measures the participant's attention to his or her own heartbeat, the accuracy with which that is perceived, and the ability of the participant to report that measurement. However, results can be influenced by the participant's preexisting knowledge of his or her heart rate and an insensitivity to heart rate change.

Heartbeat detection tasks work by providing a participant with a musical tone which is played simultaneously or non-simultaneously with one's heartbeat, asking the participant to report whether it is simultaneous or not with the tones. Heartbeat detection is commonly used because of its ability discern an individual's performance above chance levels, so-called "good detectors". However, such detection rates among participants for this task are usually only 35%. It also measures the participant's attention, detection, discrimination, accuracy and self-report of the interoceptive process.

Heartbeat attention tasks are the most minimalistic, and involve simply the top-down direction of attention towards an interoceptive sensation such as the heartbeat, breath, or stomach. Most perceptions of heartbeat sensations usually occur during a time of homeostatic perturbation, such as when the state of the body changes from external or internal influences such as physical exertion or elevated arousal states, e.g., riding a roller coaster, watching a scary movie, public speaking anxiety, or having a panic attack. For this reason, cardiac interoception is also sometimes studied by inducing perturbations of bodily state. This can be done pharmacologically using adrenaline-like drugs, such as isoproterenol, which mimic activation of the sympathetic nervous system, resulting in increased heart rate and respiration rate, similar to the "fight-or-flight" response. This approach provides a physiological basis for understanding psychiatric and neurological disorders that are characterized by heightened sympathetic nervous system activity.

=== Respiratory and chemoreceptive system ===
Respiratory perception can differ from other interoceptive physiological symptoms because of an individual's ability to exert voluntary control over the system with controlled breathing or breathing exercises. This system is often measured using restrictive breathing loads and/or CO_{2} inhalation, which are designed to mimic labored breathing sensations. Dyspnea, or difficulty breathing, is a commonly felt sensation associated with panic attacks; however, due to the voluntary control of breathing, this domain of interoception usually requires implementation of much more elaborate experimental controls to quantify in comparison to cardiac interoception.

=== Gastrointestinal and genitourinary systems ===
Common interoceptive sensations related to the gastrointestinal and genitourinary systems are hunger and fullness. These are homeostatic signals that tell an individual when to eat and when to stop eating. The dorsal mid-insula appears to be integral in taste processing during gastrointestinal interoceptive attention tasks. Rectal and bladder distensions are used as a method to perturb the homeostatic environment of the gastrointestinal and genitourinary systems, using placement of balloon catheters which can be inflated to achieve different stimulus intensities. Associative fear learning paradigms have been used to study how innocuous signals might lead to abnormal states of gastrointestinal hypersensitivity and anxiety. Biofeedback therapy has been used for individuals with impaired gastrointestinal interoception, showing positive outcomes for some patients.

=== Nociceptive system ===
Nociception refers to the receiving and processing of pain inducing stimuli by the central nervous system. Functional brain imaging studies during painful stimulation of the skin with heated probes, during mechanical compression, and electric shock have suggested that the insular cortex is prominently activated during pain processing. Thus while pain was once thought of as an exteroceptive sensation, based on functional imaging and anatomical evidence it is now understood that it has an interoceptive component.

=== Thermoregulatory system ===
Temperature and pain are thought to be represented as "feelings" of coolness and warmness and pleasantness or unpleasantness in the brain. These sensory and affective characteristics of thermoregulation may motivate certain behavioral responses depending on the state of the body (for example, moving away from a source of heat to a cooler space). Such perturbations in the internal homeostatic environment of an organism are thought to be key aspects of a motivational process giving rise to emotional states, and have been proposed to be represented principally by the insular cortex as feelings. These feelings then influence drives when the anterior cingulate cortex is activated.

=== Endocrine and immune systems ===
The endocrine and immune systems are necessary body systems that aid in allostasis and homeostatic control. Imbalances in these systems, along with other genetic and social factors, may be linked to interoceptive dysregulation in depression. These increased allostatic changes may cause a hyperawareness of interoceptive signaling and a hypo-awareness of exteroceptive signaling in depression patients.

=== Affective touch ===
Affective touch refers to the stimulation of slow, unmyelinated C tactile afferents. This is accompanied by a sense of pleasantness, and has been linked to brain–heart interactions, and likened to other interoceptive modalities like thermoregulation and nociception because of the similarities in anatomical function. Soft touch activates the insula rather than the somatosensory cortex, indicating that it has an affective importance absent in Aβ fibers. Since soft touch utilizes a separate pathway, it may have a social relevancy, allowing the body to separate the "noise" of outward stimuli from stimuli that evokes an affective feeling.

== Neuroanatomical pathways ==
Multiple neural pathways relay information integral to interoceptive processing from the body to the brain. these include the lamina I spinothalamic pathway, the visceroceptive pathway, and the somatosensory pathway.

=== Lamina I spinothalamic pathway ===
The lamina I spinothalamic pathway is commonly known for carrying information to the brain about temperature and pain, but it has been suggested to more broadly relay all information about the homeostatic condition of the body.

- Afferent signals enter the spinal cord at the superficial layer of the dorsal horn
- Second order neurons cross the midline of the spinal cord and project up the opposite side, synapsing on the nucleus of the solitary tract, parabrachial nucleus, and periaqueductal gray in the brainstem
- Third order neurons in the ventral posteromedial nucleus in the thalamus relay the signal to the dorsal posterior insula
- The signal is re-represented on either the right or left side

=== Visceroceptive pathway ===
The visceroceptive pathway relays information about visceral organs to the brain.

- Afferent signals from the vagus nerve enter the brainstem making synaptic connections with the nucleus of the solitary tract and parabrachial nucleus
- The signal is relayed to the ventromedial basal nucleus of the thalamus
- Third order neurons send the signal to the posterior insula

=== Somatosensory pathway ===
The somatosensory pathway relays information about proprioception and discriminative touch to the brain through different receptors in the skin.

- Afferent signals from the mechanoreceptors or proprioceptors enter the spinal cord at the dorsal root ganglia
- Second order neurons cross the midline in the medulla, projecting up the opposite side and synapse on third order neurons in the ventral posterior lateral nucleus or ventromedial posterior nucleus of the thalamus
- Third order neurons in the thalamus relay the signal to the primary somatosensory cortex in the brain

== Cortical processing of interoception ==
=== Thalamus ===
The thalamus receives signals from sympathetic and parasympathetic afferents during interoceptive processing. The ventromedial posterior nucleus (VMpo) is a subregion of the thalamus which receives sympathetic information from lamina I spinothalamic neurons. The human VMpo is much larger than that of primates and sub-primates and is important for processing of nociceptive, thermoregulatory, and visceral sensations. The ventromedial basal nucleus (VMb) receives parasympathetic information from visceral and gustatory systems.

=== Insular cortex ===
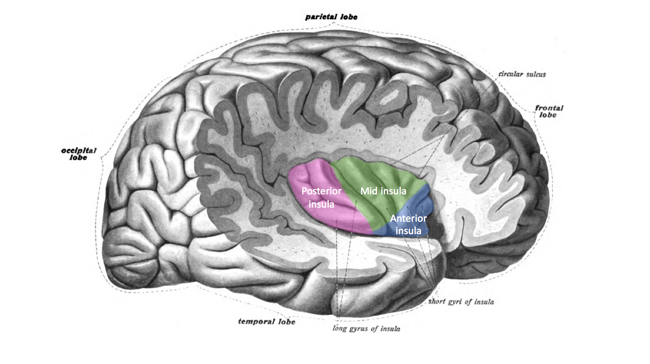
This image divides the insula into its anterior, mid, and posterior regions, with each being denoted by different colors

The insula is critically involved in the processing, integration, and cortical representation of visceral and interoceptive information. Lamina I spinothalamic and vagal afferents project via the brainstem and thalamus to the posterior and mid dorsal insula respectively. From there, information travels to the posterior and mid-insula, which combines visceral and somatosensory information.

The insula is also activated during a variety of exteroceptive and affective tasks. The insula is considered to be a "hub" region because it has an extremely high number of connections with other brain areas, suggesting it may be important for an integration of lower-level physiological information and salience.

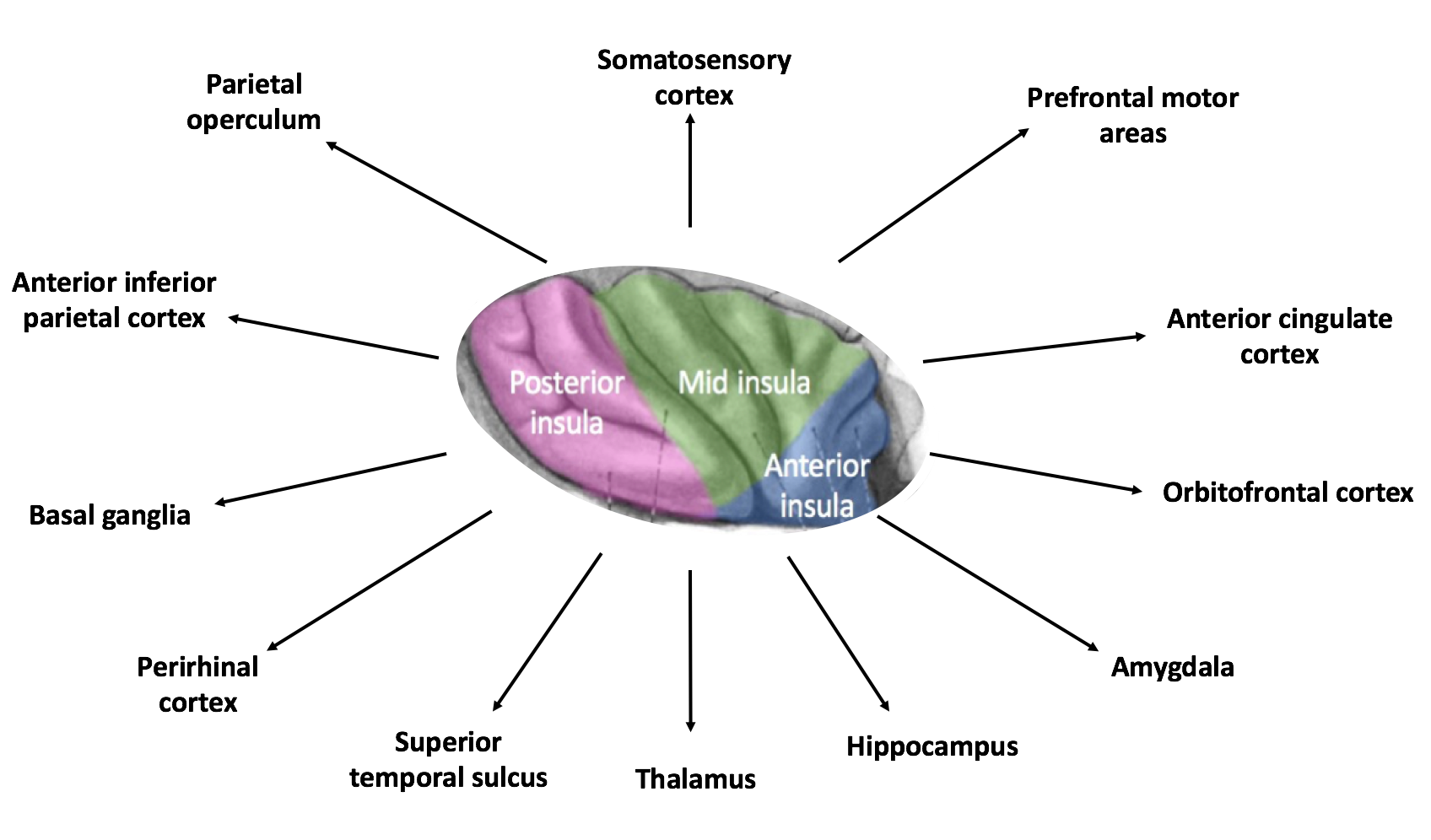
The insula connects to many regions in the brain and is highly involved in many homeostatic functions.

=== Anterior insular cortex ===
The anterior insular cortex (AIC) is involved in the representation of "cognitive feelings" which arise from the moment-to-moment integration of homeostatic information from the body. These feelings engender self-awareness by creating a sentient being (someone able to feel and perceive) aware of bodily and cognitive processing. Essentially all subjective bodily feelings are associated with activation in the anterior insula: interoceptive feelings come to awareness in the anterior insula.

PET studies of cool feelings revealed that activiation that correlated with the subjective ratings of cool temperatures on the hand appeared first in the mid-insula, and then it was strongest in the right anterior insula and orbitofrontal cortex. Feelings from the body of heat pain or C-tactile affective touch also produce activation in the posterior, mid-, and anterior insula, and the strongest activation associated with these subjective feelings is in the anterior insula.

One study of heat pain explicitly showed that activation in the dorsal posterior insula correlated with objective painful heat intensity, whereas activation in the right anterior insula correlated with subjective pain intensity ratings. Similarly, subjective ratings of flavors and tastes correlates strongly with activation in the left anterior insula. The available evidence supports the interpretation that feelings from the body is engendered in the anterior insula.

=== Cytoarchitecture and granulation ===
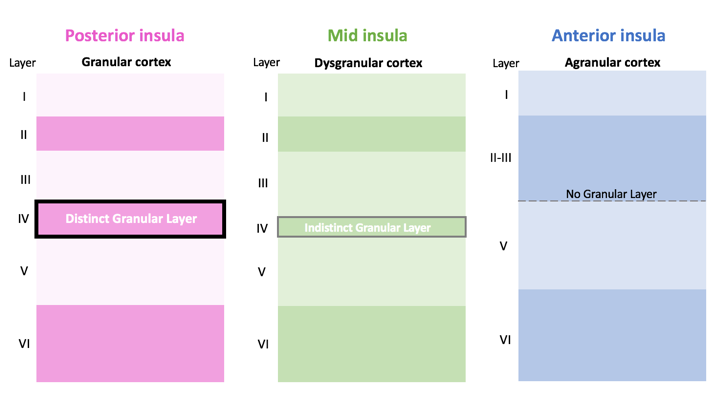
The insular cortex differs cytoarchitecturally based on its anterior, mid, and posterior regions. The posterior insular cortex is granular, the mid insular cortex is dysgranular (or slightly granulated) and the anterior insular cortex has no granulation whatsoever.

The insula contains three major subregions defined by the presence or absence of a granule cell layer: granular, dysgranular (slightly granulated) agranular. Each of these portions of the insular cortex are important for different levels of functional connectivity. Information from the thalamus is projected to all three regions. Those with increased granulation are considered to be capable of receiving sensory input.

=== Anterior cingulate cortex ===
The anterior cingulate cortex (ACC) plays a significant role in motivation and the creation of emotion. An emotion can be seen as comprising both a feeling and a motivation based on that feeling. According to one view, the "feeling" is represented in the insula, while the "motivation" is represented in the ACC. Many interoceptive tasks activate the insula and ACC together, specifically tasks that elicit strong aversive feeling states like pain.

=== Somatosensory cortex ===
The sensory motor cortex provides an alternative pathway for sensing interoceptive stimuli. Although not following the conventional pathway for interoceptive awareness, skin afferents which project to the primary and secondary somatosensory cortices provide the brain with information regarding bodily information. This area of the brain is commonly engaged by gastrointestinal distension and nociceptive stimulation, but it likely plays a role in representing other interoceptive sensations as well.

In one study, a patient with bilateral insula and ACC damage was given isoproterenol as a method of exciting the cardiovascular system. Despite damage to putative interoceptive areas of the brain, the patient was able to perceive his heartbeat with similar accuracy compared to healthy individuals; however, once lidocaine was applied to the patient's chest over the region of maximum cardiac sensation and the test was run again, the patient did not sense any change in heartbeat whatsoever. This suggested that somatosensory information from afferents innervating the skin outside of the heart may provide information to the brain about the heart's pounding through the somatosensory cortex.

== Interoception and emotion ==
The relationship between interoception and emotional experience is an intimate one. In the late 19th century, Charles Darwin noted and discussed the involvement of sensations from the viscera by describing similarities between humans and animals reactions to fear in his book, The Expression of Emotions in Man and Animals. Later, William James and Carl Lange developed the James-Lange theory of emotion, which states that bodily sensations provide the critical basis for emotional experience.

The somatic marker hypothesis, proposed by Antonio Damasio, expands upon the James-Lange theory and posits that decisions and the ensuing behaviors are optimally guided by physiological patterns of interoceptive and emotional information. Ensuing models focusing on the neurobiology of feelings states emphasized that the brain's mapping of different physiological body states are the critical ingredients for emotional experience and consciousness. In another model, Bud Craig argues that the intertwining of interoceptive and homeostatic processes is responsible for initiating and maintaining motivational states and engendering human self-awareness.

== Interoception and illness ==
=== Interoception and mental illness ===
Disturbances of interoception occur prominently and frequently in psychiatric disorders. These symptom fluctuations are often observed during the most severe expression of dysfunction, and they figure prominently in diagnostic classification of several psychiatric disorders. A few typical examples are reviewed next.

==== Panic disorder ====
Palpitations and dyspnea are hallmarks of panic attacks. Studies have shown that panic disorder patients report a heightened experience of interoceptive sensations, but these studies have failed to clarify whether this is simply due to their systematic bias toward describing such feelings. However, other studies have shown that panic disorder patients feel heartbeat sensations more intensely when the state of the body is perturbed by pharmacological agents, suggesting they exhibit heightened sensitivity to experiencing interoceptive sensations.

==== Generalized anxiety disorder ====
Patients with generalized anxiety disorder (GAD) frequently report being bothered by interoceptive feelings of muscle tension, headaches, fatigue, gastrointestinal complaints, and pain.

==== Posttraumatic stress disorder ====
Functional neuroimaging studies have shown that posttraumatic stress disorder (PTSD) patients exhibit a decreased activation in the right anterior insula, a region of the brain that is largely responsible for identifying the mismatch between cognitive and interoceptive states. Further, because PTSD patients have shown decreased activation within many nodes of the lamina I homeostatic pathway—a pathway through which the thalamus sends interoceptive information to the anterior insula and anterior cingulate—it has been suggested that PTSD patients experience reduced interoceptive awareness. Approaches such as somatic experiencing use an interoceptive approach to treat PTSD.

==== Anxiety disorders ====
The broad consensus of studies investigating the link between interoceptive awareness and anxiety disorders is that people with anxiety disorders experience heightened awareness of and accuracy in identifying interoceptive processes. Functional imaging studies provide evidence that people with anxiety disorders experience heightened interoceptive accuracy, suggested by hyperactivation in the anterior cingulate cortex—a region of the brain associated with interoception—in several different kinds of anxiety disorders. The insula has been suggested to be abnormal in a large scale study across anxiety disorders in general. Other studies have found that interoceptive accuracy is increased in these patients, as evidenced by their superior ability in heartbeat detection tasks in comparison to healthy controls.

==== Anorexia nervosa ====
Anorexia nervosa (AN) has been associated with interoceptive disturbances. Patients with AN often develop insensitivity to interoceptive cues of hunger, and yet are highly anxious and report disturbed interoceptive experiences, both inside and out. While AN patients concentrate on distorted perceptions of their body exterior in fear of weight gain, they also report altered physical states within their bodies, such as indistinct feelings of fullness, or an inability to distinguish emotional states from bodily sensations in general (called alexithymia).

==== Bulimia nervosa ====
Studies suggest that patients with and recovered from bulimia nervosa (BN) exhibit abnormal interoceptive sensory processing and reduced interoceptive awareness under resting physiological conditions. Specifically, patients with BN report reduced sensitivity to many other kinds of internal and external sensations, exhibiting increased thresholds to heat pain compared to healthy subjects and an increased gastric capacity. Neuroimaging literature suggests a pattern of abnormal interoceptive processing in patients with BN based on increased activity and volume in the insula and anterior cingulate cortex—regions associated with interoception and taste processing—when looking at food.

==== Major depressive disorder ====
Major depressive disorder (MDD) has been theoretically linked to interoceptive dysfunction. Studies have shown that women with MDD are less accurate on heartbeat counting tasks than are men with MDD and that, in general, patients with MDD are less accurate at counting heartbeat than are patients with panic or anxiety disorders. However, patients with MDD do not always exhibit reduced cardiac interoceptive accuracy; depressed patients experiencing high levels of anxiety will actually be more accurate on heartbeat detection tasks than depressed patients with lower levels of anxiety.

==== Somatic symptom disorders ====
Patients with somatic symptom disorders score lower on heartbeat detection tasks than healthy controls, suggesting that interoceptive accuracy is poor in psychosomatic disorders. It has also been found that patients with psychosomatic disorders who are anxious or stressed report physical symptom discomfort at lower heart rates during exercise treadmill tests, implying poorer interoceptive distress tolerance in somatic symptom disorders with comorbid psychiatric conditions.

==== Obsessive compulsive disorder ====
Results from a study investigating the relationship between obsessive compulsive disorder (OCD) and internal body signals found that patients with OCD were more accurate on a heartbeat perception task than healthy controls and anxiety patients heightened interoceptive awareness.

==== Autism spectrum disorder ====
Patients with autism spectrum disorder (ASD) may have poorer interoceptive awareness than control subjects. It is hypothesized that this decrease in interoceptive accuracy is due to alexithymia, which is often associated with ASD. However, it has also been found that children with ASD actually show greater interoceptive sensitivity than control subjects when measured over a long period of time. Further investigation into the relationship between interoception and ASD is needed in order to fully understand the interoceptive aspect of the disorder.

=== Interoception and other illness ===
==== Fibromyalgia ====
A 2024 study found that some FM people had higher interoception signals.

==== Aphantasia ====
Aphantasia—the absence of voluntary mental imagery—has been linked to disruptions in interoception, suggesting that vivid imagery relies on accurately sensing internal bodily states and exerting volitional control over them. According to the interoceptive theory of mental imagery and aphantasia, Interoception may provide the embodied grounding necessary for generating and consciously controlling mental simulations.

== Current theories of interoceptive processing ==
=== Embodied predictive interoception coding (EPIC) ===
The EPIC model proposes a method of understanding the brain's response to stimuli contrary to the classic "stimulus-response" model. The classical view of information processing is that when a peripheral stimulus provided information to the central nervous system, it was processed in the brain, and a response was elicited. The EPIC model deviates from this and proposes that the brain is involved in a process of active inference, that is, assiduously making predictions about situations based on previous experiences. These predictions, when coupled with incoming sensory signals, allow the brain to compute a prediction error. Interoceptive prediction errors signal the occurrence of discrepancies within the body, which the brain attempts to minimize. This can be done by modifying the predictions through brain-related pathways, altering the body position/location in order to better align incoming sensory signals with the prediction, or altering the brain's method of receiving incoming stimuli. Interoceptive prediction error signals are a key component of many theories of interoceptive dysfunction in physical and mental health.

== Research and treatments ==
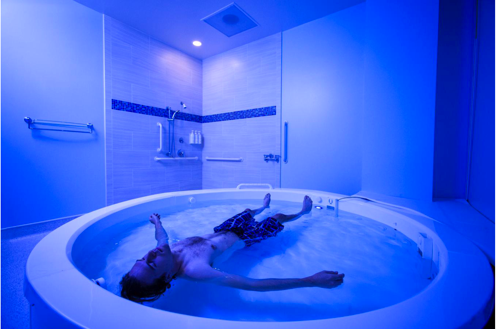
An open float pool

As attention on interoception increases among the scientific community, new research methods and treatment tactics are beginning to emerge. Because there currently is not a clear consensus as to what exactly interoception is, or the best ways in which to measure it, most research and questionnaires on the subject only measure individual facets of interoception. The convergence and interrelatedness of the questionnaire items between the constructs has been found to be low.

Ongoing research in interoception has shown the importance of perturbing interoceptive systems. This allows researchers the ability to document the effects of non-baseline states, which occur during times of panic or anxiety. It also provides the participant the ability to gauge the intensity of sensations within the body. This can be done through pharmacological interventions, balloon distensions, or respiratory breathing loads depending on the interoceptive system of interest.

Another research method used to study interoception is specialized flotation environments. Floating removes external stimuli so that individuals can more easily focus on the interoceptive sensations within their bodies. One idea with floating is that over many float sessions, patients with different kinds of disorders may learn to become more attuned or tolerant of their interoceptive sensations not only in the float tank but also in their everyday lives.

Whole body hyperthermia may provide a new treatment technique for major depressive disorder. It is thought that reducing one of the bodily symptoms of depression, which is increased inflammation, using whole body hyperthermia will also reduce depressive feelings represented in the brain. In theory, these techniques will help patients better attune themselves to their interoceptive sensations, allowing them a better understanding of what occurs in their bodies.

Acupuncture is an alternative treatment type for many people with anxiety and depression. Typically, it is self-prescribed by patients; however, results are inconclusive on its ability to manage symptoms of depression. Recently, Massage therapy has been shown to have the ability to reduce symptoms of generalized anxiety disorder.

Meditation and mindfulness have been looked into as possible techniques to enhance interoceptive awareness based on their tendency to redirect focus within oneself. Studies show that meditation and mindfulness practices promote attention to interoceptive sensations. In reality, with all the benefits of mindfulness, many may be ascribed to an increase in interoception. However, interoceptive awareness and accuracy in specific domains such as breath or body monitoring, may be more independent from a broad improvement in interoceptive accuracy. Meditation and mindfulness practices have been shown to modify the insula, which is considered central to our interoceptive abilities. Attention is also being given to the subtle body and its function as a CNS map in traditional Tibetan and Indian medicine.

Although a universal definition of interoception has not been reached, research on interoception and psychiatric disorders has shown a link between interoceptive processing and mental disorders. It has been proposed that exposure therapy, a commonly employed treatment for anxiety disorders, may provide a basis for a model of interoceptive exposure therapy that could be incorporated into treatment plans of different psychiatric disorders. One proposal states that multiple interoceptive challenges assessing different physiological systems could provide diagnosticians with the ability to create an "interoceptive profile" for a specific individual, creating a patient-specific treatment plan.

== See also ==
- Inflammatory reflex
- Proprioception
