= Outback ER =

Australian television series

Outback ER is an Australian factual television show that looks at the work of the Emergency Department at Broken Hill Base Hospital in Broken Hill. This observational documentary series began on the ABC on 12 February 2015.

== See also ==
- Kings Cross ER
- RPA
- Medical Emergency
