= Homeostatic feeling =

Feelings, like thirst and well-being, that tell us about the state of the body

Homeostatic feeling is a class of feelings (e.g. thirst, fatigue, pain, desire, malaise, well-being) that inform us about our physiological condition.

[Homeostatic] feelings arise from the uninterrupted process of life regulation and correspond to both salient physiological fluctuations such as hunger, pain, well-being, or malaise, as well as to states closer to metabolic equilibrium and best described as feelings of life/existence, such as breathing or body temperature.

Antonio and Hannah Damasio, 2023

Affective neuroscientist, Jaak Panksepp, identified homeostatic feeling as one of three primary classes of affect:

- homeostatic affect: e.g., thirst, fatigue
- sensory affect: e.g., touch, warmth
- emotional affect: e.g., anger, fear.

The Damasios describe just two classes of feelings: emotions and homeostatic feelings. They bundle unvalenced sensation (what Panksepp called sensory affect) along with motivated, valenced feelings into one class: "homeostatic feeling".

Some homeostatic feelings have a positive or negative valence and motivate specific behavior aimed at maintaining the body in its ideal state. For example, hunger motivates eating, fatigue motivates resting, and feeling hot motivates stepping into the shade.

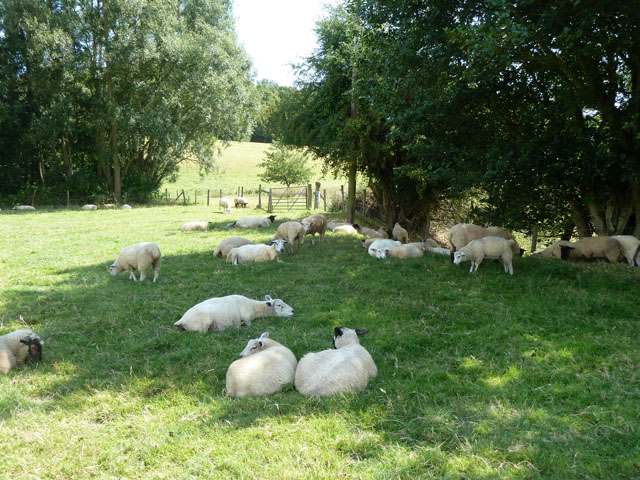
Sheep respond to hunger, fatigue and hyperthermia by grazing and resting in the shade of a tree

Pain is a motivating homeostatic feeling; we respond to it by withdrawing from a harmful situation, protecting a damaged body part while it heals, and avoiding similar experiences in the future.

Neuroscientist Derek Denton called these motivating homeostatic feelings "primordial emotions" and defined them as "the subjective element of the instincts, which are the genetically programmed behaviour patterns which contrive homeostasis. They include thirst, hunger for air, hunger for food, pain, hunger for specific minerals etc. There are two constituents of a primordial emotion—the specific sensation which when severe may be imperious, and the compelling intention for gratification by a consummatory act."

Neuroanatomist Arthur Craig called these motivating homeostatic feelings "homeostatic emotions" and found that anthropoid primates (humans, apes and monkeys) form an image of all of the body's unique homeostatic sensations in the brain's primary interoceptive cortex (located in the dorsal posterior insula). This image is re-represented in the mid- and anterior insula, and the anterior insula (modified by input from cognitive, affective and reward-related circuits) plays a role in conscious awareness of the whole body's homeostatic state. A sensation re-represented in the anterior insula and that sensation's related motivation (involving neural activity in the anterior cingulate cortex and other regions) form a homeostatic emotion.

== Consciousness ==
Derek Denton proposed that primordial emotions are the likely incubators of consciousness in evolution; that a kind of non-reflective consciousness evolved along with these feelings and before the emergence of cognition. This opposes the view put by Edelman and others that consciousness emerged after the development of cognitive processes such as the ability to create a scene from diverse sensory inputs.

Denton saw the evolution of consciousness as a gradual, continuous process, beginning in the brain's most primitive regions with non-reflective consciousness of instincts, followed by the emergence of reflective consciousness of these instincts, then reflective consciousness of surroundings evolves, followed by the emergence of reflective consciousness of memories and behavioural options.

Antonio and Hanna Damasio, too, observe, "It is likely that homeostatic feelings were the inaugural phenomena of consciousness in evolution ..." and they propose that "homeostatic feelings were selected [in evolution] because the spontaneous information they provided regarding the current state of life regulation conferred extraordinary advantages to the respective organisms. The ‘knowledge’ carried by conscious homeostatic feelings enabled overt guidance of life regulation."

They argue that without ongoing awareness of our homeostatic state, no other mode of consciousness (such as awareness of surroundings, memories and self) is possible.

== See also ==
- Interoception
