= Brachium =

Brachium (plural brachia) may refer to:

- The arm or the upper arm
- The traditional name of the star Sigma Librae
- Brachium of inferior colliculus, part of the brain
- Brachium of superior colliculus, part of the brain
- Brachia conjunctiva, part of the brain

== See also ==
- Antebrachium, the forearm
- Parabrachial area
- Medial parabrachial nucleus
- Lateral parabrachial nucleus
