= The Primordial Emotions =

2006 book by Derek Denton

The Primordial Emotions: The Dawning of Consciousness
- Author: Derek Denton
- Language: English
- Subject: Consciousness
- Publication date: 2006
- Publication place: Australia
- Media type: Print
- ISBN: 978-0-19-920314-7

The Primordial Emotions: The Dawning of Consciousness is a 2006 book by Australian neuroscientist Derek Denton.

== Summary ==
Denton argues that, if self-awareness and intentionality are intrinsic to consciousness, the primordial emotions such as thirst, hunger and pain (that involve feeling the self and intentionality) are the likely precursors to consciousness; that a kind of non-reflective consciousness evolved along with these feelings and before the emergence of cognition. This opposes the view put by Edelman and others that consciousness emerged after the development of cognitive processes such as the ability to create a scene from diverse sensory inputs.

He sees the evolution of consciousness as a gradual, continuous process, beginning in the brain's most primitive regions with non-reflective consciousness of instincts, followed by reflective consciousness of the feelings and impulses associated with these instincts (this subjective experience is what he terms "primordial emotions"), then reflective consciousness of surroundings evolves, followed by the emergence of reflective consciousness of memories and behavioural options.

Denton distinguishes between

1. primordial emotions, "imperious states of arousal and compelling intentions to act" (p. 7) driven by activation of interoceptors and involving ancient, lower brain regions such as the medulla, midbrain and hypothalamus, and
2. "classic" emotions, such as anger, fear and love, driven by distance receptors (vision, hearing, olfaction) and mediated by higher, more recently evolved brain regions.
