= Safari Kimanzi =

Safari Kimanzi (or Kimanthi), best known as just "Safari" (born 20 August 1993), is a Kenyan who as a six-year-old boy received extensive plastic surgery over the course of 12 months to correct disfigurement of his face, neck, shoulder and hand caused by severe burns when he was an infant in Kenya. He was operated on by a team of volunteers at the Royal Prince Alfred Hospital (RPA) in Sydney, Australia, headed by senior plastic surgeon, Dr David Pennington. Safari spent almost twelve months in Australia, in and out of hospital, for his 14 operations. Before his surgery he was malnourished and only able to eat mashed bananas and milk because of severe contractures of his mouth and neck. His plight was discovered by Lesley Coverdale who was visiting with a friend in the area where Safari lived. She returned to Australia and began raising funds for his treatment. In a chance meeting with Ms Coverdale, Pennington, the Head of RPA's Department of Plastic Surgery, offered to operate on Safari gratis. Further funds to accomplish this were raised through the Adventist Development and Relief Agency (ADRA) and after nearly a year he was flown to Australia for treatment. At the end of his twelve-month treatment program in 2000, he was able to eat normally and was enabled to use his arm and hand for day-to-day activities.

His case was brought to the attention of the Australian public primarily through the television series RPA which was filmed at the hospital, and covered Safari's rehabilitation over the course of a year. Safari became a household name as the large RPA audience followed his progress from week to week. Safari's travel and accommodation expenses were paid for by ADRA, which also raised funds to assist Safari's village in Kenya. Channel Nine assisted in his return to Kenya.

Safari lives with foster parents in Australia. He is studying at St. Philip's Christian College.

== Biography ==
Safari is from Kasaala, a small village in the Ikutha Division of Kitui District, in the Eastern Province of Kenya, a country in East Africa. The village is located by the Tsavo National Park. He was born around the year 1994.

The book Let the Journey Begin: Safari's Story, was published in 2001.

After Safari returned to Africa, his mother died in 2003 from a snakebite.

As of 2007, Safari lives with foster parents Janet Seath and Frank Scaysbrook in the town of Buttaba, in the City of Lake Macquarie in New South Wales, Australia. The couple has published the book Safari: I Won't Cry, Mother.

In 2001, Seath and Scaysbrook criticised the Adventist Development and Relief Agency (ADRA), a major sponsor, for allegedly not providing promised funds to Safari's village and for his education (ADRA had raised $180,000). On 7 January 2001, Seath & Scaysbrook's criticisms were aired on Channel 7's television program, "Today Tonight" (rival to Nine's "A Current Affair") and on Sydney radio station 2GB. In response, ADRA rejected the charges, and quoted a formal NSW state government investigation that had found the complaint to be unjustified. Dr. David Pennington, the head of plastic surgery at the RPA hospital, and who led the surgical team, also rejected the charges. The reason why funds were slow to be disbursed was that they had to pass through Kenyan government channels in order to fund an upgrade of the Kasaala Medical Clinic and extensions to the Kasaala school. However, these funds eventually did flow to the benefit of the Kasaala community.
