= Gustatory cortex =

Brain structure responsible for perception of taste

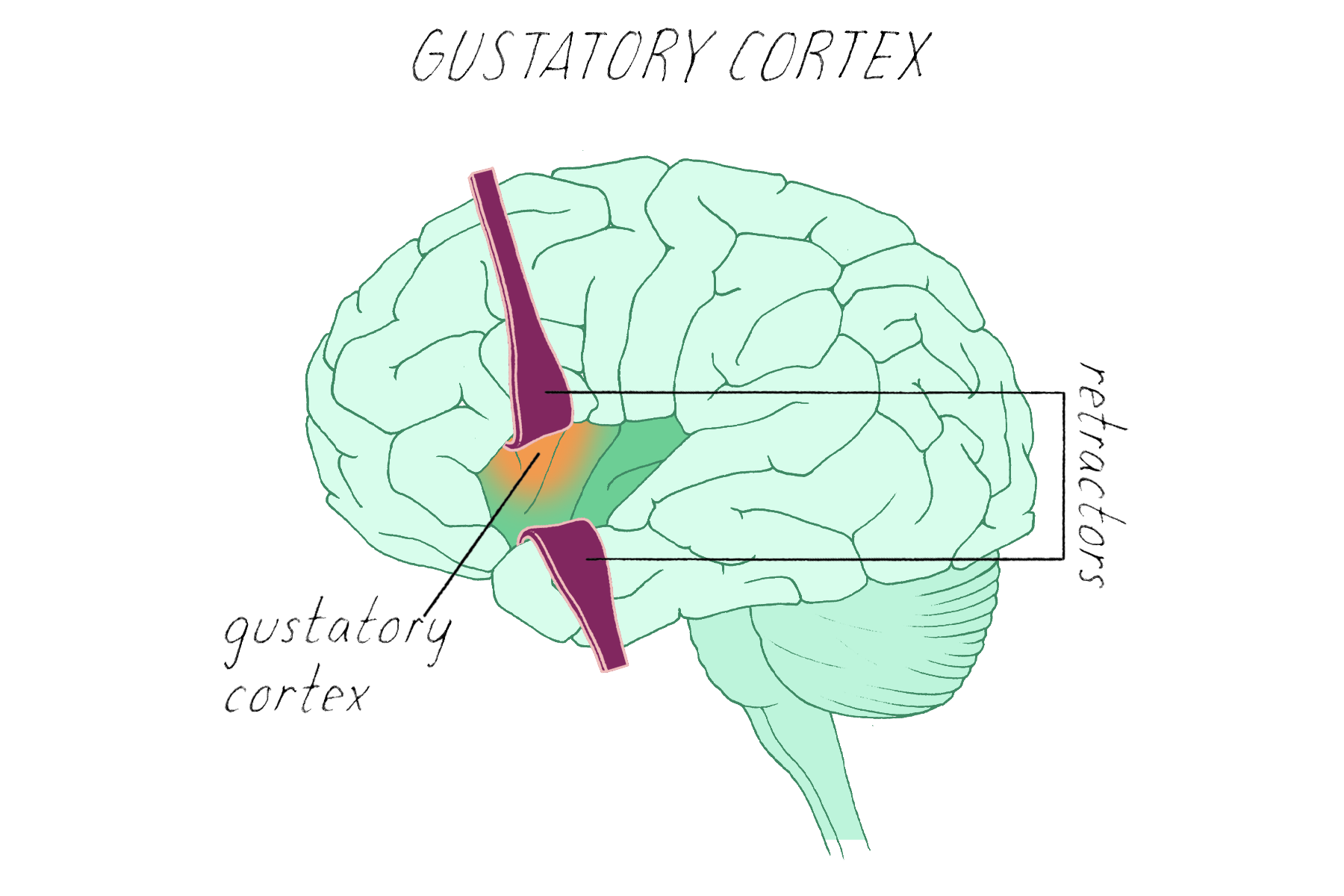
The area of the brain that processes taste information from receptors in the mouth.

The primary gustatory cortex (GC) is a brain structure responsible for the perception of taste. It consists of two substructures: the anterior insula on the insular lobe and the frontal operculum on the inferior frontal gyrus of the frontal lobe. Because of its composition the primary gustatory cortex is sometimes referred to in literature as the AI/FO (Anterior Insula/Frontal Operculum). By using extracellular unit recording techniques, scientists have elucidated that neurons in the AI/FO respond to sweetness, saltiness, bitterness, and sourness, and they code the intensity of the taste stimulus.

== Role in the taste pathway ==
Like the olfactory system, the taste system is defined by its specialized peripheral receptors and central pathways that relay and process taste information. Peripheral taste receptors are found on the upper surface of the tongue, soft palate, pharynx, and the upper part of the esophagus. Taste cells synapse with primary sensory axons that run in the chorda tympani and greater superficial petrosal branches of the facial nerve (cranial nerve VII), the lingual branch of the glossopharyngeal nerve (cranial nerve IX), and the superior laryngeal branch of the vagus nerve (cranial nerve X) to innervate the taste buds in the tongue, palate, epiglottis, and esophagus respectively. The central axons of these primary sensory neurons in the respective cranial nerve ganglia project to rostral and lateral regions of the nucleus of the solitary tract in the medulla, which is also known as the gustatory nucleus of the solitary tract complex. Axons from the rostral (gustatory) part of the solitary nucleus project to the ventral posterior complex of the thalamus, where they terminate in the medial half of the ventral posterior medial nucleus. This nucleus projects in turn to several regions of the neocortex, including the gustatory cortex, which becomes activated when the subject is consuming and experiencing taste.

== Functionality and stimulation ==
There have been many studies done to observe the functionality of the primary gustatory cortex and associated structures with various chemical and electrical stimulations as well as observations of patients with lesions and GC epileptic focus. It has been reported that electrical stimulation of the lingual nerve, chorda tympani, and a lingual branch of the glossopharyngeal nerve elicit evoked field potential in the frontal operculum. Electrical stimulation of the insula in the human elicit gustatory sensations. Gustatory information is conveyed to the orbitofrontal cortex, the secondary gustatory cortex from the AI/FO. Studies have shown that 8% of neurons in the orbitofrontal cortex respond to taste stimuli, and a part of these neurons are finely tuned to particular taste stimuli. It has also been shown in monkeys that the responses of orbitofrontal neurons to taste decreased when the monkey eats to satiety. Furthermore neurons in the orbitofrontal cortex respond to the visual, and/or olfactory stimuli in addition to the gustatory stimulus. These results suggest that gustatory neurons in the orbitofrontal cortex may play an important role in food identification and selection. A patient study reported that damage in the rostral part of the insula caused gustatory disturbance, as well as taste recognition and intensity deficits in patients with insular cortex lesions. It has also been reported that a patient who had an epileptic focus in the frontal operculum and epileptic activity in the focus produced a disagreeable taste. Activation in the insula also takes place when exposed to gustatory imagery. Studies compared the activated regions in subjects shown food pictures to those shown location pictures and found that food pictures activated the right insula/operculum and the left orbitofrontal cortex.

== Chemosensory neurons ==
Chemosensory neurons are those that discriminate between tastant as well as between the presence or absence of a tastant. In these neurons, the responses to reinforced (stimulated by tastant) licks in rats were greater than to those for the unreinforced (not stimulated by tastant) licks. They found that 34.2% of the GC neurons exhibited chemosensory responses. The remaining neurons discriminate between reinforced and unreinforced licks, or process task related information.

== Taste coding ==
How GC encodes taste qualities and representations has been a source of major debate. Cortical representation theories have been greatly influenced by peripheral taste coding models. In particular, there are two main model of peripheral taste coding: a labelled-line model, which posits that each taste receptor codes for a specific taste quality (sweet, sour, salty, bitter, umami); and an across-fiber model, which proposes that taste perception arises from the combined activity of multiple unspecific taste receptors. Accordingly, the labelled-line model suggests the existence of a topographical map, in which distinct tastes activate distinct neurons, specifically tuned to a particular taste and spatially distributed in a clustered manner (a gustotopic map). In contrast, the across-fiber model implies that taste is encoded in the ensemble firing patterns of mixed populations of broadly tuned cortical neurons, a process named population coding. Even though the labelled-line model better characterizes the activity of peripheral taste receptors, current evidence seems to support the population coding model in GC. Importantly, early evidence in rodent models pointed to the existence of a gustotopic map; however, recent studies in both mice, through two-photon calcium imaging, and humans, through fMRI, indicated distributed population coding in GC. These models have focused on the spatial organization of GC, while another proposed coding mechanism is temporal coding, which posits that information about taste quality is conveyed through a precise spiking pattern of GC neurons.

Some researchers have noted that the AI/FO neurons are intrinsically multimodal, that is, they respond to other modalities in addition to taste (often to olfaction and/or somatosensation). These findings could imply that GC is not strictly involved in taste perception but also in more domain general functions, such as decision making regarding consummatory behaviors and valence processing.

== Tastant concentration-dependent neuronal activity ==
GC chemosensory neurons exhibit concentration-dependent responses. In a study done on GC responses in rats during licking, an increase in MSG (monosodium glutamate) concentration lingual exposure resulted in an increase in firing rate in the rat GC neurons, whereas an increase in sucrose concentration resulted in a decrease in firing rate. GC neurons exhibit rapid and selective response to tastants. Sodium chloride and sucrose elicited the largest response in the rat gustatory cortex in rats, whereas citric acid causes only a moderate increase in activity in a single neuron. Chemosensory GC neurons are broadly tuned, meaning that a larger percentage of them respond to a larger number of tastants (4 and 5) as compared to the lower percentage responding to a fewer number of tastants (1 and 2). In addition, the number of neurons responding to a certain tastant stimulus varies. In the rat gustatory complex study, it was shown that more neurons responded to MSG, NaCl, sucrose, and citric acid (all activating approximately the same percentage of neurons) as compared to the compounds quinine (QHCl) and water.

== Responsiveness to changes in concentration ==
Studies using the Gustatory cortex of the rat model have shown that GC neurons exhibit complex responses to changes in concentration of tastant. For one tastant, the same neuron might increase its firing rate whereas for another tastant, it may only be responsive to an intermediate concentration. In studies of chemosensory GC neurons, it was evident that few chemosensory GC neurons monotonically increased or decreased their firing rates in response to changes in concentration of tastants (such as MSG, NaCl, and sucrose), the vast majority of them responded to concentration changes in a complex manner. In such instances with several concentration tastants tested, the middle concentration might evoke the highest firing rate (like 0.1 M sucrose), or the highest and lowest concentrations might elicit the highest rates (NaCl ), or the neuron might respond to only one concentration.

GC neurons cohere and interact during tasting. GC neurons interact across milliseconds, and these interactions are taste specific and define distinct but overlapping neural assemblies that respond to the presence of each tastant by undergoing coupled changes in firing rate. These couplings are used to discriminate between tastants. Coupled changes in firing rate are the underlying source of GC interactions. Subsets of neurons in GC become coupled after presentation of particular tastants and the responses of neurons in that ensemble change in concert with those of others.

== Taste familiarity ==
GC units signal taste familiarity at a delayed temporal phase of the response. An analysis suggests that specific neuronal populations participate in the processing of familiarity for specific tastants. Furthermore, the neural signature of familiarity is correlated with familiarization with a specific tastant rather than with any tastant. This signature is evident 24 hours after initial exposure. This persistent cortical representation of taste familiarity requires slow post-acquisition processing to develop. This process may be related to the activation of neurotransmitter receptors, modulation of gene expression, and posttranslational modifications detected in the insular cortex in the first hours after the consumption of an unfamiliar taste.
