= Brett Sutton (doctor) =

Australian public health physician

Brett Sutton AO
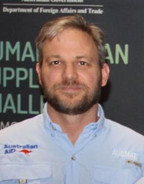

Chief Health Officer of Victoria
- In office 21 March 2019 – 29 July 2023
- Preceded by: Charles Guest
- Succeeded by: Clare Looker

Personal details
- Born: Brett Andrew Sutton; 1968 or 1969 (age 56–57)
- Spouse: Kate Sutton
- Education: Melbourne High School
- Alma mater: University of Melbourne; James Cook University
- Profession: Public health doctor

Brett Andrew Sutton AO (born 1968 or 1969) is an Australian public health doctor who served as the Chief Health Officer of Victoria between March 2019 and July 2023. Sutton served in this role during the COVID-19 pandemic and became a public face of the response to the pandemic in Victoria.

In addition to his role as Chief Health Officer of Victoria, Sutton is currently Chief Human Biosecurity Officer for Victoria, a Fellow of the Royal Society for Public Health, a Fellow of the Australasian College of Tropical Medicine, a Fellow of the Australasian Faculty of Public Health Medicine (AFPHM) and is a member of the Faculty of Travel Medicine.

== Life and career ==
Brett Sutton grew up in Croydon, Melbourne. He attended Melbourne High School and then went on to complete the Bachelor of Medicine, Bachelor of Surgery medical degrees at the University of Melbourne, and graduated from James Cook University in 2008 with a Master of Public Health and Tropical Medicine.

Following university, Sutton worked in emergency medicine, and has worked with a number of international emergency and field-based organisations including Médecins Sans Frontières, the International Rescue Committee in Kenya and Ethiopia, and John Snow International in Timor-Leste. During this time he was featured in several episodes of the reality television series Medical Emergency.

Sutton also worked in health in the developing world and performed field-based work in Afghanistan and East Timor.

== Public health career ==
Throughout the 2010s, Sutton served in public health roles relating to communicable disease at the Department of Health and Human Services of Victoria. In March 2019 he was appointed Chief Health Officer.

As Chief Health Officer during the COVID-19 pandemic, Sutton provided public health advice to the state government in response to the virus and used emergency powers under the Public Health and Wellbeing Act 2008 to impose restrictions and lockdowns in Victoria. After the virus had re-entered the community through leaks in the hotel quarantine system, Melbourne faced the longest-lasting and strictest restrictions seen in Australia, with a 112-day lockdown imposed in Melbourne during the second half of 2020, and a night time curfew and 5 km travel limit. These measures were ultimately successful, with restrictions being removed towards the end of 2020 as Victoria achieved elimination of the virus from the community.

Sutton gave evidence at an inquiry investigating the leak of the virus from hotel quarantine into the community. He said that it was "astounding" that he was excluded from the process to plan the hotel quarantine system and said he had no knowledge that private security were being used in the system until reading about it in the media in May 2020. The inquiry found that the leak into the community was caused by poorly trained private security guards and poor cleaning and training procedures, but was unable to determine who commissioned the use of private security.

Throughout the pandemic, Sutton appeared regularly at press conferences with the premier and other ministers. As a result, he became a public face of the Victorian Government response to the virus.

Sutton was appointed an Officer of the Order of Australia in the 2024 Australia Day Honours for "distinguished service to the people of Victoria through public health administration and governance, and to medicine". This was met with criticism by 3AW's Mornings host Tom Elliott, who said he was "horrified" when he discovered Sutton would be receiving the honour, citing the ongoing detrimental effects associated with Melbourne's COVID-19 lockdowns.

=== Scandal ===
In early February 2019, an elderly woman died at the Knox Private Hospital and was certified as having listeria (a bacterium Listeria monocytogenes) infection. Sandwiches supplied by I Cook Foods were alleged as the source. On 22 February, Sutton announced a public health alert and closure of I Cook Foods. The company owner, Ian Cook blamed Sutton of reckless decision and accused health inspector Elizabeth Garlick of planting the slug, which was taken as evidence of unhygienic condition of the factory.

A whistleblower from the Greater Dandenong Council Kim Rogerson came up with evidences of doctored images on the presence of slug. An Australian parliamentary inquiry in 2021 found that evidences were overlooked that led to "considerable confusion". A legal battle in the High Court of Australia ended in November 2023, with the court blaming Sutton for unfairly closing the food company.
