= Chris O'Brien (surgeon) =

Australian surgeon

- Born: Christopher John O'Brien; 3 January 1952; Regents Park, New South Wales
- Died: 4 June 2009 (aged 57); Royal Prince Alfred Hospital, Sydney, Australia
- Education: Parramatta Marist High School, University of Sydney
- Years active: 1976–2009
- Known for: RPA
- Medical career
- Profession: Surgeon
- Institutions: Royal Prince Alfred Hospital; University of Sydney; Sydney South West Area Health Service
- Sub-specialties: Head and neck surgery
- Research: Head and neck cancer

Christopher John O'Brien AO (3 January 1952 – 4 June 2009) was an Australian head and neck surgeon. He achieved national recognition as a compassionate surgeon in the reality television series RPA.

== Early life ==
O'Brien was born into a working-class family and grew up in a Housing Commission home in the western Sydney suburb of Regents Park. He was educated at Parramatta Marist High School, where he was school captain, captain of the firsts rugby league team and dux of the class of 1969. He later graduated in medicine from the University of Sydney.

== Medical career ==
O'Brien rose to the positions of Director of the Sydney Cancer Centre based at Royal Prince Alfred Hospital and the University of Sydney, Professor of Surgery at the University of Sydney, Director of the Sydney Head and Neck Cancer Institute, and Director of Cancer Services for the Sydney South West Area Health Service. He founded the Australian and New Zealand Head Neck Society in 1998 and was President of the Society in 2004. During his career, O'Brien lectured widely overseas, wrote several books and wrote more than 100 scientific papers.

O'Brien was instrumental in establishing the Chris O'Brien Lifehouse cancer centre (named after him posthumously). Australian Prime Minister Kevin Rudd said "Chris' vision was for an integrated cancer treatment centre so that patients would no longer have to navigate their way through all the different elements of dealing with their illness alone."

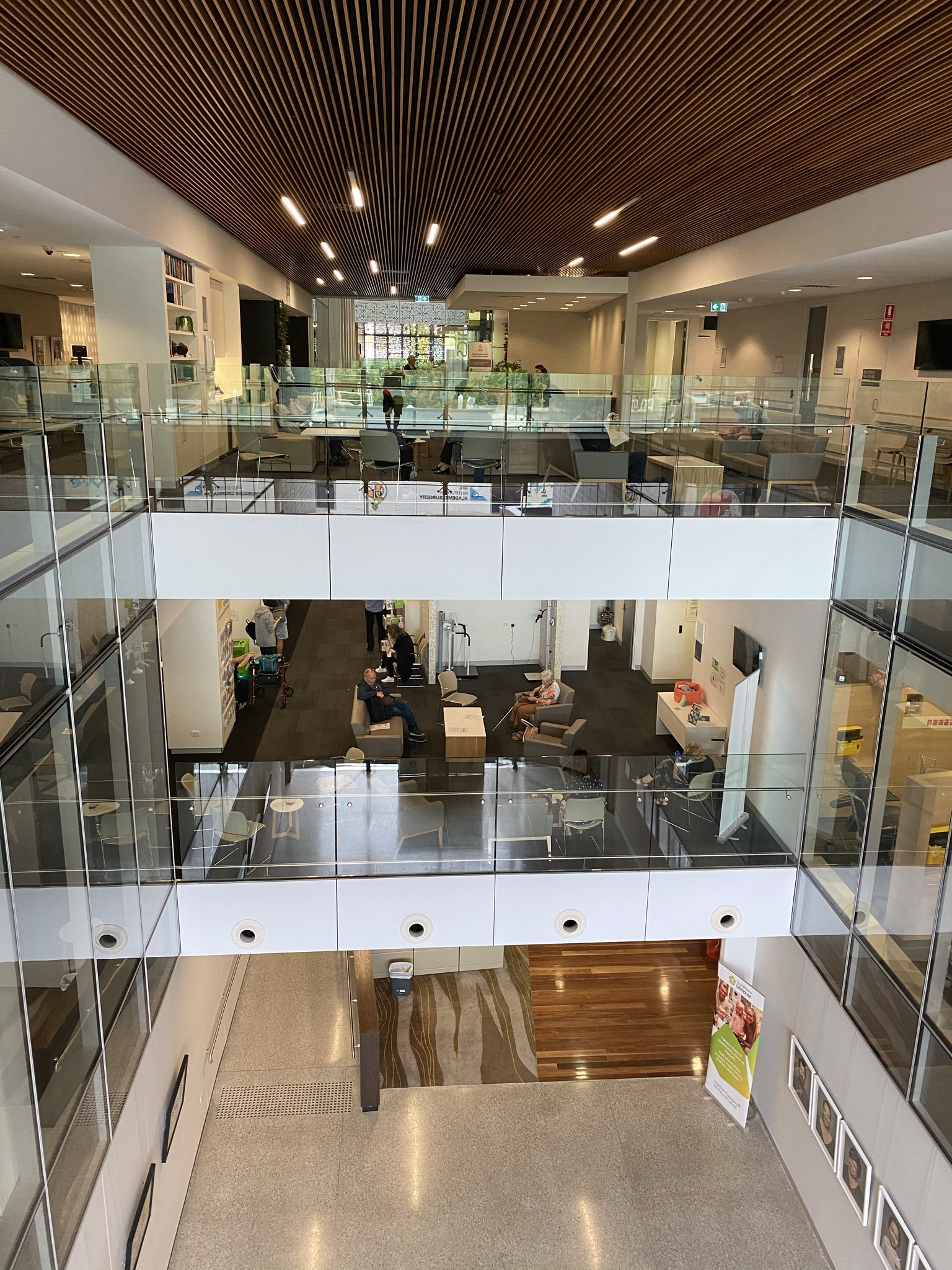
Inside Chris O'Brien Lifehouse, Camperdown

== Television ==
O'Brien first appeared on the medical reality series RPA in 1997.

== Illness and death ==
O'Brien was diagnosed with a highly malignant brain tumour (glioblastoma multiforme) in November 2006. He underwent brain surgery on five occasions, as well as radiotherapy and chemotherapy. He detailed his battle with the illness in his autobiographical book Never Say Die. He died on 4 June 2009.

O'Brien was given a state funeral service at St Mary's Cathedral in Sydney. He is survived by his wife Gail and children.

Prime Minister Kevin Rudd flew to Sydney shortly before O'Brien's death to present him with his appointment as an Officer of the Order of Australia. He was invested posthumously. After his death, Rudd said

I believe Chris O'Brien has been a truly exceptional Australian. Chris O'Brien was a man of leadership, vision and courage. He inspired people, both through his work as a cancer specialist and through his own three-year battle with an aggressive, highly malignant brain tumour.

== Recognition and awards ==
- 2009 – O'Brien was awarded Officer of the Order of Australia posthumously

"For continued service to medicine and to the community through advocacy and fundraising roles for the development of integrated care and clinical research facilities for people with cancer, particularly the establishment of the Lifehouse Centre at Royal Prince Alfred Hospital"

- 2005 – Member of the Order of Australia

"For service to medicine, particularly to the speciality of head and neck surgery through leadership as a clinical researcher and teacher"

Following his death, The Chris O'Brien Lifehouse at Royal Prince Alfred Hospital was named in his honour. The facility is a part of the Sydney Cancer Centre, dedicated to cancer treatment and research.
