= Kings Cross ER: St Vincent's Hospital =

2012–2015 Australian TV series

- Genre: Factual
- Created by: John McAvoy
- Starring: St Vincent's Hospital Staff
- Narrated by: Sacha Horler
- Country of origin: Australia
- Original language: English
- No. of seasons: 3
- No. of episodes: 21

Production
- Producer: Claire Haywood
- Production location: St Vincent's Hospital
- Running time: 60 minutes (Including commercials)
- Production company: Eyeworks Australia

Original release
- Network: Crime & Investigation Network (2012–2013); Nine Network (2015)
- Release: 2 February 2012 – 15 October 2015

Kings Cross ER: St Vincent's Hospital is an Australian factual television show that looks at the work of the Emergency Department at St Vincent's Hospital in Darlinghurst, Sydney. This observational documentary series began on the Crime & Investigation Network on 2 February 2012. A second season began on 14 February 2013. A third season began in 2015 on the free-to-air Nine Network and aired 7:30 pm Thursdays.

The show was created and produced by John McAvoy. It is narrated by Australian actress Sacha Horler.

== Series overview ==
| Season | Episodes | Originally aired | | Network |
| Season | Episodes | Premiere | Finale | Network |
|---|---|---|---|---|
| 1 | 10 | 2 February 2012 | 5 April 2012 | CI Network |
| 2 | 10 | 14 February 2013 | 18 April 2013 | CI Network |
| 3 | 6 | 10 September 2015 | 15 October 2015 | Nine Network |

== Overview ==
St Vincent's Hospital's emergency department, located in Darlinghurst is one of the busiest in New South Wales with 42,000 patients presenting each year. It is a level one trauma centre with a catchment area that includes many of Sydney's nightlife precincts including Kings Cross, Sydney's CBD, Rose Bay, Surry Hills, Paddington, Woollahra, Bondi Junction and Double Bay. The hospital's location in Australia's most populous city makes for a diverse catchment area. The program observes the fast-paced work of the emergency department's dedicated doctors and nurses and their interactions with patients and each other.

== Episodes ==
=== Season 1 ===
| No. in series | No. in season | Original air date | Viewers | Daily Rank | Ref |
|---|---|---|---|---|---|
| 1 | 1 | 2 February 2012 | 133,000 | #1 | |
| 2 | 2 | 9 February 2012 | 74,000 | #4 | |
| 3 | 3 | 16 February 2012 | 57,000 | #13 | |
| 4 | 4 | 23 February 2012 | 53,000 | #15 | |
| 5 | 5 | 1 March 2012 | 67,000 | #1 | |
| 6 | 6 | 8 March 2012 | 60,000 | #9 | |
| 7 | 7 | 15 March 2012 | —N/a | | |
| 8 | 8 | 22 March 2012 | 62,000 | #8 | |
| 9 | 9 | 29 March 2012 | —N/a | | |
| 10 | 10 | 5 April 2012 | 52,000 | #17 | |

=== Season 2 ===
| No. in series | No. in season | Original air date | Viewers | Daily Rank | Ref |
|---|---|---|---|---|---|
| 11 | 1 | 14 February 2013 | 66,000 | #4 | |
| 12 | 2 | 21 February 2013 | 63,000 | #6 | |
| 13 | 3 | 28 February 2013 | 53,000 | #7 | |
| 14 | 4 | 7 March 2013 | —N/a | | |
| 15 | 5 | 14 March 2013 | —N/a | | |
| 16 | 6 | 21 March 2013 | —N/a | | |
| 17 | 7 | 28 March 2013 | —N/a | | |
| 18 | 8 | 4 April 2013 | —N/a | | |
| 19 | 9 | 11 April 2013 | —N/a | | |
| 20 | 10 | 18 April 2013 | —N/a | | |

=== Season 3 ===
| No. in series | No. in season | Original air date | Viewers (millions) | Daily Rank | Ref |
|---|---|---|---|---|---|
| 21 | 1 | 10 September 2015 | 0.659 | #11 | |
| 22 | 2 | 17 September 2015 | 0.541 | #20 | |
| 23 | 3 | 24 September 2015 | 0.550 | #16 | |
| 24 | 4 | 1 October 2015 | 0.688 | #10 | |
| 25 | 5 | 8 October 2015 | —N/a | | |
| 26 | 6 | 15 October 2015 | —N/a | | |

== Doctors and nurses ==
=== Season 1 ===
- Professor Gordian Fulde, director of ER
- Kirsty Short, registrar
- Jo Short, registrar
- Dr Andrew Finckh, staff specialist
- Dr Kate Sellors, senior registrar
- Dr Tim Stewart, registrar
- Brendan Clifford, nurse
- Adele Mooney, nurse
- Carolyn Milton, nurse
- Justine Branch, nurse
- David Darley, senior resident

=== Season 2 ===
- Professor Gordian Fulde, director of ER
- Kirsty Short, registrar
- Jo Short, registrar
- Dr Iromi Samarasinghe, physician
- Dr Anthony Van Assche, registrar
- Dr Jamie Andrews, registrar
- Dr Lee Blair, registrar
- Dr Mo Haywood, senior resident
- Dr Nikki Bart, senior resident

== Reception ==
Kings Cross ER: St Vincent's Hospital has been praised by critics. Graeme Blundell of The Australian applauded the program, writing "It is thoughtful, thorough, emotional and professional and, rare for reality TV, leaves us with more questions than answers and more hope than despair."

In its first two seasons on the CI Network, Kings Cross ER became the highest rating documentary series in Australian subscription television history. It was subsequently acquired by the Nine Network and its ratings increased on the free-to-air channel.

=== Logie Awards ===
| Year | Nominee | Award | Result |
|---|---|---|---|
| 2013 | Kings Cross ER: St Vincent's Hospital | Most Outstanding Factual Program | Nominated |
| 2014 | Kings Cross ER: St Vincent's Hospital | Most Outstanding Factual Program | Won |

== See also ==
- RPA
- Young Doctors
- Medical Emergency
