= Brain–body interaction =

Neural activity coordinating the brain and the body

Brain–body interactions are patterns of neural activity in the central nervous system to coordinate the activity between the brain and body. The nervous system consists of central and peripheral nervous systems and coordinates the actions of an animal by transmitting signals to and from different parts of its body. The brain and spinal cord are interwoven with the body and interact with other organ systems through the somatic, autonomic and enteric nervous systems. Neural pathways regulate brain–body interactions and allow to sense and control its body and interact with the environment.

== Types of interactions ==
Various types of brain–body interactions have been distinguished. For example, brain–gut interactions are biochemical signaling that takes place between the gastrointestinal tract and the central nervous system. Brain–heart interactions link cardiac physiology to activity in the central and peripheral nervous system and may explain how peripheral cardiovascular arousal can influence decision making and the regulation of social and emotional behaviours. Brain–muscle interactions involve both efferent nerve fibers that transmit action potentials to the muscles to generate muscle contractions and afferent nerve fibers that transmit somatosensory information back to the central nervous system.

== Brain–body networks ==
Interactions between brain regions have been studied using functional connectivity analysis. Resting state fMRI has shown that brain activity in different brain areas are coupled and form brain networks that can be studied using graph theory. Brain–body interactions can be studied using a similar approach by estimating functional connectivity between brain activity and peripheral electrophysiology, for example between brain activity and ECG, EGG or EMG activity. Synchrony between slow pulse fluctuations (related to sympathetic activity) and brain fMRI signal has revealed a network of sensory brain regions that appear to be relevant for characterizing human personality and emotions. These analyses can be extended to investigate interactions between multiple organ systems that together form a brain–body network.

The brain–body interactions are supported by peripheral nervous system that connects the CNS to the limbs and organs. These structural connections can be mapped using neuroimaging techniques such as diffusion MRI to map the complete human connectome.
