= Medical Emergency (TV series) =

Australian reality television series

- Starring: Georgie Parker (2005); Chris Gabardi (2006–2010)
- Country of origin: Australia

Production
- Running time: approx 0:30 (with commercials)

Original release
- Network: Channel Seven
- Release: 2005 – 2010

Medical Emergency is an Australian reality television series screened on the Seven Network. Medical Emergency is narrated by actor Chris Gabardi who also appeared in drama series All Saints. It was previously hosted and narrated by actress Georgie Parker, who also appeared in All Saints. Medical Emergency is filmed under strict protocol at Melbourne's Alfred Hospital's trauma unit.

Medical Emergency is a ratings hit in Australia and has screened alongside other popular reality series such as Border Security, Police Files: Unlocked and The Real Seachange. A second series started airing Tuesday nights at 8:00pm from 17 July 2007. A third series started airing Tuesday nights at 9:30pm from 8 April 2008. Then three weeks later it was moved to Wednesdays at 8:00pm. The last new episode aired in 2010, however repeats are still aired on the Seven Network on a regular basis.

One notable inclusion is registrar Brett Sutton, who would go on to be Victoria's Chief Health Officer during the COVID-19 pandemic.

== See also ==
- List of Australian television series
- RPA
- Young Doctors
- Kings Cross ER: St Vincent's Hospital
