= Insular cortex =

Portion of the mammalian cerebral cortex

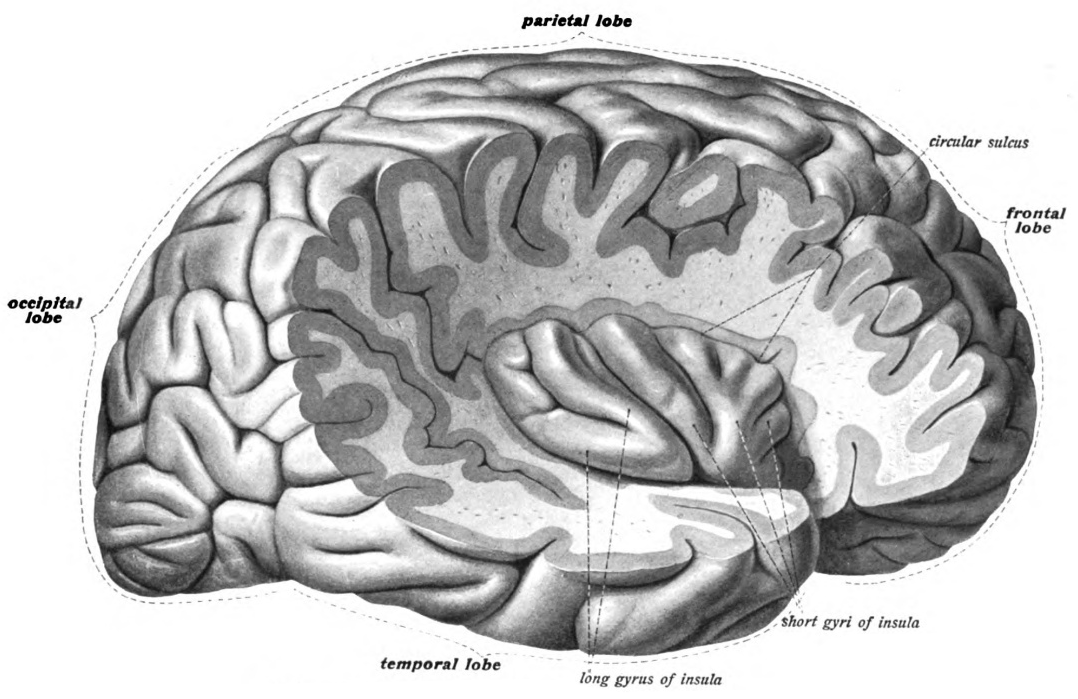
- Right insula, exposed by removing the opercula

- 3D view of the insular cortex

Details
- Part of: Cerebral cortex of brain
- Artery: Middle cerebral

Identifiers
- Latin: cortex insularis
- MeSH: D000087623
- NeuroNames: 111
- NeuroLex ID: birnlex_1117
- TA98: A14.1.09.149; A12.2.07.053
- TA2: 5502
- FMA: 67329

The insular cortex (also insula and insular lobe) is a portion of the cerebral cortex folded deep within the lateral sulcus (the fissure separating the temporal lobe from the parietal and frontal lobes) within each hemisphere of the mammalian brain.

The insulae are believed to be involved in consciousness and play a role in diverse functions usually linked to emotion, interoception, or the regulation of the body's homeostasis. These functions include compassion, empathy, taste, perception, motor control, self-awareness, cognitive functioning, interpersonal relationships, and awareness of homeostatic emotions such as hunger, pain and fatigue. In relation to these, it is involved in psychopathology.

The insular cortex is divided by the central sulcus of the insula, into two parts: the anterior insula and the posterior insula in which more than a dozen field areas have been identified. The cortical area overlying the insula toward the lateral surface of the brain is the operculum (meaning lid). The opercula are formed from parts of the enclosing frontal, temporal, and parietal lobes.

== Structure ==
The insula is divided into an anterior and a posterior part by the central sulcus of the insula.

=== Connections ===
The anterior part of the insula is shallow sulci divided into three or four short gyri.

The anterior insula receives a direct projection from the basal part of the ventral medial nucleus of the thalamus and a particularly large input from the central nucleus of the amygdala. In addition, the anterior insula itself projects to the amygdala.

One study on rhesus monkeys revealed widespread reciprocal connections between the insular cortex and almost all subnuclei of the amygdaloid complex. The posterior insula projects predominantly to the dorsal aspect of the lateral and to the central amygdaloid nuclei. In contrast, the anterior insula projects to the anterior amygdaloid area as well as the medial, the cortical, the accessory basal magnocellular, the medial basal, and the lateral amygdaloid nuclei.

The posterior part of the insula is formed by a long gyrus.

The posterior insula connects reciprocally with the secondary somatosensory cortex and receives input from spinothalamically activated ventral posterior lateral thalamic nuclei. It has also been shown that this region receives inputs from the ventromedial nucleus (posterior part) of the thalamus that are highly specialized to convey homeostatic information such as pain, temperature, itch, local oxygen status, and sensual touch.

A human neuroimaging study using diffusion tensor imaging revealed that the anterior insula is interconnected to regions in the temporal and occipital lobe, opercular and orbitofrontal cortex, triangular and opercular parts of the inferior frontal gyrus. The same study revealed differences in the anatomical connection patterns between the left and right hemisphere.

The circular sulcus of insula (or sulcus of Reil) is a semicircular sulcus or fissure that separates the insula from the neighboring gyri of the operculum in the front, above, and behind.

=== Cytoarchitecture ===
The insular cortex has regions of variable cell structure or cytoarchitecture, changing from granular in the posterior portion to agranular in the anterior portion. The insula also receives differential cortical and thalamic input along its length. The anterior insular cortex contains a population of spindle neurons (also called von Economo neurons), identified as characterising a distinctive subregion as the agranular frontal insula.

=== Development ===
The insular cortex is considered a separate lobe of the telencephalon by some authorities. Other sources see the insula as a part of the temporal lobe. It is also sometimes grouped with limbic structures deep in the brain into a limbic lobe. As a paralimbic cortex, the insular cortex is considered to be a relatively old structure.

== Function ==
=== Multi-modal sensory processing, sensory binding ===
Functional imaging studies show activation of the insula during audio-visual integration tasks.

=== Taste ===
The anterior insula is part of the primary gustatory cortex. Research in rhesus monkeys has also reported that apart from numerous taste-sensitive neurons, the insular cortex also responds to non-taste properties of oral stimuli related to the texture (viscosity, grittiness) or temperature of food.

=== Speech ===
The sensory speech region, Wernicke's area, and the motor speech region, Broca's area, are interconnected by a large axonal fiber system known as the arcuate fasciculus which passes directly beneath the insular cortex. On account of this anatomical architecture, ischemic strokes in the insular region can disrupt the arcuate fasciculus. Functional imaging studies on the cerebral correlates of language production also suggest that the anterior insula forms part of the brain network of speech motor control. Moreover, electrical stimulation of the posterior insular can evoke speech disturbances such as speech arrest and reduced voice intensity.

Lesion of the pre-central gyrus of the insula can also cause "pure speech apraxia" (i.e. the inability to speak with no apparent aphasic or orofacial motor impairments). This demonstrates that the insular cortex forms part of a critical circuit for the coordination of complex articulatory movements prior to and during the execution of the motor speech plans. Importantly, this specific cortical circuit is different from those that relate to the cognitive aspects of language production (e.g., Broca's area on the inferior frontal gyrus). Subvocal, or silent, speech has also been shown to activate right insular cortex, further supporting the theory that the motor control of speech proceeds from the insula.

=== Interoceptive awareness ===
There is evidence that, in addition to its base functions, the insula may play a role in certain higher-level functions that operate only in humans and other great apes. The spindle neurons found at a higher density in the right frontal insular cortex are also found in the anterior cingulate cortex, which is another region that has reached a high level of specialization in great apes. It has been speculated that these neurons are involved in cognitive-emotional processes that are specific to primates including great apes, such as empathy and metacognitive emotional feelings. This is supported by functional imaging results showing that the structure and function of the right frontal insula is correlated with the ability to feel one's own heartbeat, or to empathize with the pain of others. It is thought that these functions are not distinct from the lower-level functions of the insula but rather arise as a consequence of the role of the insula in conveying homeostatic information to consciousness. The right anterior insula is engaged in interoceptive awareness of homeostatic emotions such as thirst, pain and fatigue, and the ability to time one's own heartbeat. Moreover, greater right anterior insular gray matter volume correlates with increased accuracy in this subjective sense of the inner body, and with negative emotional experience. It is also involved in the control of blood pressure, in particular during and after exercise, and its activity varies with the amount of effort a person believes he/she is exerting.

The insular cortex also is where the sensation of pain is judged as to its degree. Lesion of the insula is associated with dramatic loss of pain perception and isolated insular infarction can lead to contralateral elimination of pinprick perception. Further, the insula is where a person imagines pain when looking at images of painful events while thinking about their happening to one's own body. Those with irritable bowel syndrome have abnormal processing of visceral pain in the insular cortex related to dysfunctional inhibition of pain within the brain.

Physiological studies in rhesus monkeys have shown that neurons in the insula respond to skin stimulation. PET studies have also revealed that the human insula can also be activated by vibrational stimulation to the skin.

Another perception of the right anterior insula is the degree of nonpainful warmth or nonpainful coldness of a skin sensation. Other internal sensations processed by the insula include stomach or abdominal distension. A full bladder also activates the insular cortex.

One brain imaging study suggests that the unpleasantness of subjectively perceived dyspnea is processed in the right human anterior insula and amygdala.

The cerebral cortex processing vestibular sensations extends into the insula, with small lesions in the anterior insular cortex being able to cause loss of balance and vertigo.

Other noninteroceptive perceptions include passive listening to music, laughter and crying, empathy and compassion, and language.

=== Motivational control ===
The insular cortex has also been implicated in motivational control. Evidence from animal studies suggests that insular activity is shaped by internal need states during learned cue-guided behavior; for example, responses to food-predictive cues in rodent insular cortex are enhanced during hunger and attenuated after satiation. In rodents, an anterior insula–brainstem pathway has been reported to regulate the vigor of reward-seeking behavior in a need-dependent manner, supporting a role for the insula in linking bodily state signals to motivated action.

=== Motor control ===
In motor control, it contributes to hand-and-eye motor movement, swallowing, gastric motility, and speech articulation. It has been identified as a "central command" centre that ensures that heart rate and blood pressure increase at the onset of exercise. Research upon conversation links it to the capacity for long and complex spoken sentences. It is also involved in motor learning and has been identified as playing a role in the motor recovery from stroke.

=== Homeostasis ===
It plays a role in a variety of homeostatic functions related to basic survival needs, such as taste, visceral sensation, and autonomic control. The insula controls autonomic functions through the regulation of the sympathetic and parasympathetic systems. It has a role in regulating the immune system.

=== Self ===
The insula has been identified as playing a role in the experience of bodily self-awareness, sense of agency, and sense of body ownership.

=== Social emotions ===
The anterior insula processes a person's sense of disgust both to smells and to the sight of contamination and mutilation — even when just imagining the experience. This associates with a mirror neuron-like link between external and internal experiences.

In social experience, it is involved in the processing of norm violations, emotional processing, empathy, and orgasms.

The insula is active during social decision making. Tiziana Quarto et al. measured emotional intelligence (EI) (the ability to identify, regulate, and process emotions of themselves and of others) of sixty-three healthy subjects. Using fMRI EI was measured in correlation with left insular activity. The subjects were shown various pictures of facial expressions and tasked with deciding to approach or avoid the person in the picture. The results of the social decision task yielded that individuals with high EI scores had left insular activation when processing fearful faces. Individuals with low EI scores had left insular activation when processing angry faces.

=== Emotions ===
The insular cortex, in particular its most anterior portion, is considered a limbic-related cortex. The insula has increasingly become the focus of attention for its role in body representation and subjective emotional experience. In particular, Antonio Damasio has proposed that this region plays a role in mapping visceral states that are associated with emotional experience, giving rise to conscious feelings. This is in essence a neurobiological formulation of the ideas of William James, who first proposed that subjective emotional experience (i.e., feelings) arise from our brain's interpretation of bodily states that are elicited by emotional events. This is an example of embodied cognition.

In terms of function, the insula is believed to process convergent information to produce an emotionally relevant context for sensory experience. To be specific, the anterior insula is related more to olfactory, gustatory, viscero-autonomic, and limbic function, whereas the posterior insula is related more to auditory-somesthetic-skeletomotor function. Functional imaging experiments have revealed that the insula has an important role in pain experience and the experience of a number of basic emotions, including anger, fear, disgust, happiness, and sadness.

The anterior insular cortex (AIC) is believed to be correlated to emotional sensations, including maternal and romantic love, anger, fear, sadness, happiness, sexual arousal, disgust, aversion, unfairness, inequity, indignation, uncertainty, disbelief, social exclusion, trust, empathy, sculptural beauty, a 'state of union with God', and hallucinogenic states.

Functional imaging studies have also implicated the insula in conscious desires, such as food craving and drug craving. What is common to all of these emotional states is that they each change the body in some way and are associated with highly salient subjective qualities. The insula is well-situated for the integration of information relating to bodily states into higher-order cognitive and emotional processes. The insula receives information from "homeostatic afferent" sensory pathways via the thalamus and sends output to a number of other limbic-related structures, such as the amygdala, the ventral striatum, and the orbitofrontal cortex, as well as to motor cortices.

A study using magnetic resonance imaging found that the right anterior insula is significantly thicker in people that meditate. Other research into brain activity and meditation has shown an increase in grey matter in areas of the brain including the insular cortex.

Another study using voxel-based morphometry and MRI on experienced Vipassana meditators was done to extend the findings of Lazar et al., which found increased grey matter concentrations in this and other areas of the brain in experienced meditators.

The strongest evidence against a causative role for the insula cortex in emotion comes from Damasio et al. (2012) which showed that a patient who suffered bilateral lesions of the insula cortex expressed the full complement of human emotions, and was fully capable of emotional learning.

=== Salience ===
Functional neuroimaging research suggests the insula is involved in two types of salience. Interoceptive information processing that links interoception with emotional salience to generate a subjective representation of the body. This involves, first, the anterior insular cortex with the pregenual anterior cingulate cortex (Brodmann area 33) and the anterior and posterior mid-cingulate cortices, and, second, a general salience network concerned with environmental monitoring, response selection, and skeletomotor body orientation that involves all of the insular cortex and the mid-cingulate cortex. A related idea is that the anterior insula, as part of the salience network, interacts with the mid-posterior insula to combine salient stimuli with autonomic information, leading to a high state of physiological awareness of salient stimuli.

An alternative or perhaps complementary proposal is that the right anterior insular regulates the interaction between the salience of the selective attention created to achieve a task (the dorsal attention system) and the salience of arousal created to keep focused upon the relevant part of the environment (ventral attention system). This regulation of salience might be particularly important during challenging tasks where attention might fatigue and so cause careless mistakes but if there is too much arousal it risks creating poor performance by turning into anxiety.

=== Decision making ===
Studies have shown that damage or dysfunction in the insular cortex can impair decision-making, emotional regulation, and social behavior. The insula is considered a key brain structure in the neural circuitry underlying complex decision-making processes. It plays a significant role in integrating internal and external cues to facilitate adaptive choices.

=== Auditory perception ===
Research indicates that the insular cortex is involved in auditory perception. Responses to sound stimuli were obtained using intracranial EEG recordings acquired from patients with epilepsy. The posterior part of the insula showed auditory responses that resemble those observed in Heschl's gyrus, whereas the anterior part responded to the emotional contents of the auditory stimuli. Clinical data additionally shows that bilateral damage to the insula after ischemic injury or trauma can lead to auditory agnosia. Functional magnetic resonance studies have also demonstrated that the insular cortex participates in many key auditory processes such as tuning into novel auditory stimuli and allocating auditory attention.

Direct recordings from the posterior part of the insula showed responses to unexpected sounds within regular auditory streams, a process known as auditory deviance detection. Researchers observed a mismatch negativity (MMN) potential, a well known event related potential, as well as the high frequency activity signals originating from local neurons.

Simple auditory illusions and hallucinations were elicited by electrical functional mapping.

== Clinical significance ==
=== Progressive expressive aphasia ===
Progressive expressive aphasia is the deterioration of normal language function that causes individuals to lose the ability to communicate fluently while still being able to comprehend single words and intact other non-linguistic cognition. It is found in a variety of degenerative neurological conditions including Pick's disease, motor neuron disease, corticobasal degeneration, frontotemporal dementia, and Alzheimer's disease. It is associated with hypometabolism and atrophy of the left anterior insular cortex.

=== Addiction ===
A number of functional brain imaging studies have shown that the insular cortex is activated when drug users are exposed to environmental cues that trigger cravings. This has been shown for a variety of drugs, including cocaine, alcohol, opiates, and nicotine. Despite these findings, the insula has been ignored within the drug addiction literature, perhaps because it is not known to be a direct target of the mesocortical dopamine system, which is central to current dopamine reward theories of addiction. Research published in 2007 has shown that cigarette smokers suffering damage to the insular cortex, from a stroke for instance, have their addiction to cigarettes practically eliminated. These individuals were found to be up to 136 times more likely to undergo a disruption of smoking addiction than smokers with damage in other areas. Disruption of addiction was evidenced by self-reported behavior changes such as quitting smoking less than one day after the brain injury, quitting smoking with great ease, not smoking again after quitting, and having no urge to resume smoking since quitting. The study was conducted on average eight years after the strokes, which opens up the possibility that recall bias could have affected the results. More recent prospective studies, which overcome this limitation, have corroborated these findings This suggests a significant role for the insular cortex in the neurological mechanisms underlying addiction to nicotine and other drugs, and would make this area of the brain a possible target for novel anti-addiction medication. In addition, this finding suggests that functions mediated by the insula, especially conscious feelings, may be particularly important for maintaining drug addiction, although this view is not represented in any modern research or reviews of the subject.

A recent study in rats by Contreras et al. corroborates these findings by showing that reversible inactivation of the insula disrupts amphetamine conditioned place preference, an animal model of cue-induced drug craving. In this study, insula inactivation also disrupted "malaise" responses to lithium chloride injection, suggesting that the representation of negative interoceptive states by the insula plays a role in addiction. However, in this same study, the conditioned place preference took place immediately after the injection of amphetamine, suggesting that it is the immediate, pleasurable interoceptive effects of amphetamine administration, rather than the delayed, aversive effects of amphetamine withdrawal that are represented within the insula.

A model proposed by Naqvi et al. (see above) is that the insula stores a representation of the pleasurable interoceptive effects of drug use (e.g., the airway sensory effects of nicotine, the cardiovascular effects of amphetamine), and that this representation is activated by exposure to cues that have previously been associated with drug use. A number of functional imaging studies have shown the insula to be activated during the administration of addictive psychoactive drugs. Several functional imaging studies have also shown that the insula is activated when drug users are exposed to drug cues, and that this activity is correlated with subjective urges. In the cue-exposure studies, insula activity is elicited when there is no actual change in the level of drug in the body. Therefore, rather than merely representing the interoceptive effects of drug use as it occurs, the insula may play a role in memory for the pleasurable interoceptive effects of past drug use, anticipation of these effects in the future, or both. Such a representation may give rise to conscious urges that feel as if they arise from within the body. This may make addicts feel as if their bodies need to use a drug, and may result in persons with lesions in the insula reporting that their bodies have forgotten the urge to use, according to this study.

=== Subjective certainty in ecstatic seizures ===
A common quality in mystical experiences is a strong feeling of certainty which cannot be expressed in words. Fabienne Picard proposes a neurological explanation for this subjective certainty, based on clinical research of epilepsy. According to Picard, this feeling of certainty may be caused by a dysfunction of the anterior insula, a part of the brain which is involved in interoception, self-reflection, and in avoiding uncertainty about the internal representations of the world by "anticipation of resolution of uncertainty or risk". This avoidance of uncertainty functions through the comparison between predicted states and actual states, that is, "signaling that we do not understand, i.e., that there is ambiguity." Picard notes that "the concept of insight is very close to that of certainty," and refers to Archimedes' "Eureka!" Picard hypothesizes that during ecstatic seizures the comparison between predicted states and actual states no longer functions, and that mismatches between predicted state and actual state are no longer processed, blocking "negative emotions and negative arousal arising from predictive uncertainty," which will be experienced as emotional confidence. Picard concludes that "[t]his could lead to a spiritual interpretation in some individuals."

=== Other clinical conditions ===
The insular cortex has been suggested to have a role in anxiety disorders, emotion dysregulation, and anorexia nervosa.

== History ==
The insula was first described by Johann Christian Reil while describing cranial and spinal nerves and plexuses. Henry Gray in Gray's Anatomy is responsible for it being known as the Island of Reil. John Allman and colleagues showed that anterior insular cortex contains spindle neurons.

== Additional images ==
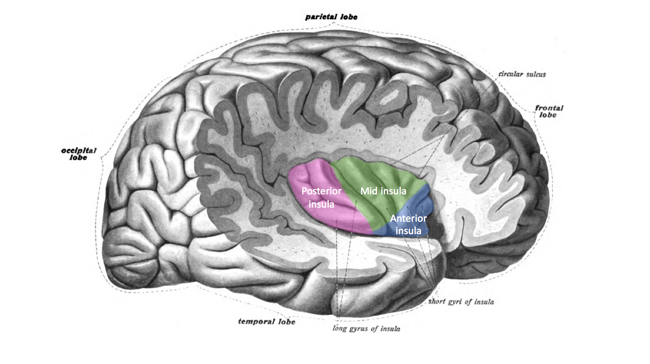
Location and structure of the insular cortex

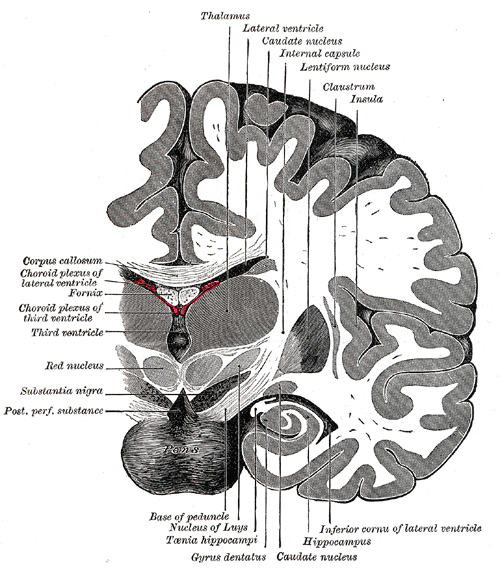
Coronal section of brain immediately in front of pons (Insula labeled at upper right)

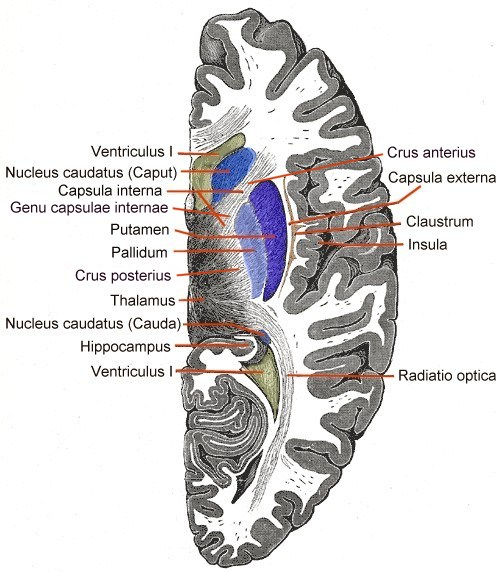
Horizontal section of left cerebral hemisphere

Insular cortex highlighted in green on coronal T1 MRI images

Insular cortex highlighted in green on sagittal T1 MRI images

Insular cortex highlighted in green on transversal T1 MRI images

== See also ==
- List of regions in the human brain
