= C tactile afferent =

Nerve receptors in mammalian skin

C tactile afferents are nerve receptors in mammalian skin that generally respond to nonpainful stimulation such as light touch. For this reason they are classified as 'low-threshold mechanoreceptors'. As group C nerve fibers, they are unmyelinated and have slow conduction velocities. They are mostly associated with the sensation of pleasant touch, though they may also mediate some forms of pain. CT afferents were discovered by Åke Vallbo using the technique of microneurography.

== Low-threshold C mechanoreceptors ==
C tactile (CT) neurons are a class of low-threshold C neurons that innervate the human skin. In animals, these neurons are referred to as C low-threshold mechanoreceptors (C-LTMRs). CT neurons belong to a group C nerve fibers; these are unmyelinated, and have slow conduction velocities.

=== Structure and location ===
Using microneurography, CT neurons have been found in the hairy skin of humans. In animals, these neurons have been genetically labelled and visualized with their relative patterns of axonal endings in hairy skin and in the spinal cord. Out of the three, two hair follicle subtypes (awl, auchene, and zigzag) have been found to be innervated by C-LTMRs in combination with other LTMRs in the rodent hairy skin. C-LTMRs also seem to exist in the rat glabrous skin (see [5]). This author provided direct electrophysiological existence of a rare population of C-LTMRs in glabrous skin of the rat hind paw. There is also indirect evidence for the presence of this population of primary afferent neurons in the mouse and other species (For references, see [5]).

In humans, new psychophysical data suggests that CT neurons may also be present in the glabrous skin, but it might be that they have different biochemical and structural characteristics to the ones found in the hairy skin. They have been found electrophysiologically in the glabrous skin of the rat hind paw, supporting the evidence of their existence in glabrous skin.

=== Molecular markers ===
Since these CTs or C-LTMRs are non-peptidergic, immuno-labelling was a challenge. However, in combination with RNA-seq data and genetically modified mouse models, several labeling markers, i.e. VGLUT3, TAFA4, CaV3.2, CaV3.3 and GINIP have been discovered to visualize C-LTMRs using double staining methods in combination with tyrosine hydroxylase (TH).

=== Role in pain ===
While these neurons are non-nociceptive and likely mediate low threshold innocuous mechanical sensations, in the context of background muscle pain using hypertonic saline they have been shown to mediate allodynia - pain due to a non-painful stimulus. Later, the role of CTs was also found in mediating allodynia in the model of a delayed onset muscle soreness, i.e. pain following eccentric exercise.

Recently, several animal studies have shown the role of C-LTMRs in neuropathic pain behaviors, which suggests that both mechanical and cold allodynia, but not heat hyperalgesia, is mediated by them.

=== Pain modulation ===
In humans, their role in pain increase has been contested as, in some instances, they have been shown to reduce pain, depending on the context of the stimulus. This dual role is also confirmed by the markers found for C-LTMRs in animal models, i.e. some markers are glutaminergic and some are GABAergic in nature.

=== Role in pleasantness ===
In humans, these CTs have always been linked to pleasant touch behavior and are most responsive during slow gentle stroking of a brush with the velocity of 3 cm/s. CT neurons project to the insular cortex in the brain, and the firing frequency of CT neurons correlate with perceived pleasantness of skin stroking. Further research has also shown that the speed with which humans stroke their partners and parents stroke their babies also fall mostly into the C tactile optimal range of about 1-10 cm/s.
