= RPA (TV series) =

- Genre: Factual
- Created by: Fiona Baker
- Narrated by: Max Cullen; Rodger Corser
- Country of origin: Australia
- Original language: English
- No. of seasons: 19

Production
- Executive producers: Fiona Baker (1995–1999); Sheryl Taylor (1995–1997)
- Production locations: Royal Prince Alfred Hospital, Sydney
- Running time: 60 minutes
- Production company: McAvoy Media

Original release
- Network: Nine Network
- Release: 1 February 1995 – 18 July 2012
- Release: 27 March – 22 May 2023

RPA is an Australian television documentary show that is filmed at Royal Prince Alfred Hospital and showcases the everyday workings of this major hospital in Sydney, Australia. Premiering in 1995, the programme is based on the British series Jimmy's which was filmed at St James's University Hospital in Leeds.

== Format ==
For the majority of its thirteen-year run, each episode of RPA would run for half an hour. However, its initial 2007 run was broadcast in combined hour-long episodes, and its return later in the year saw it assume a permanent one-hour timeslot. Operations would be recorded on camera in a graphic nature and the doctors would provide commentary as they operate on patients.

A new RPA: Where Are They Now series, begun in 2007, ran for half an hour. It profiled the lives of patients who have previously appeared on RPA, recapping the original stories and showing follow-ups on the patients' lives or deaths following their initial appearance on the programme. Both series have been narrated by Max Cullen.

A brand-new series of the medical/observational series aired on the Nine Network in October 2008. Max Cullen continued to narrate. The program returned in February 2009 for another brand new series.

In 2012, the series returned to Nine on Wednesday, 30 May, at 9.30pm, with Australian actor and artist, Max Cullen again narrating. This series was also the last of this franchise and its final episode was broadcast on 18 July.

The series returned on Monday, 27 March 2023 after a 11 year hiatus and is narrated by Australian actor, Rodger Corser.

Season 20 returned on Thursday, 3 October 2024 with a total of 8 episodes.

== Awards ==
RPA has been nominated for an award at the annual TV Week Logie Awards in every year since 2000 (eight times in succession); from 2000–2006, it was nominated in the Most Popular Reality Program category, while in 2007 it was nominated in the Most Outstanding Factual Series category. It won silver Logies at the 2000 and 2003 Logie Awards.

=== Legacy ===
In 2019, TV Week listed RPA at No. 100 in its list of the 101 greatest Australian television shows of all time, which appeared in its monthly TV Week Close Up publication. The magazine said it recognised the program's sensitivity when showing emotional scenes, but it also celebrated victories of patients and medical teams.

== Other stories ==
A feature of RPA is its storyline nature, in that it has a strong emphasis on following the stories of patients throughout the series. Examples include Kenyan burns victim Safari, who appeared in every episode of the 2001 series and in an episode of RPA: Where Are They Now.

Chris O'Brien, a head and neck surgeon, appeared since the start of the show but retired after he was diagnosed with a brain tumour in November, 2006. He recovered from his operation and his story was told on 60 Minutes. A statement from Lifehouse at RPA on Thursday 4 June 2009 said the surgeon was nearing the end of his two-and-a-half-year battle with the disease, and he was admitted to hospital on Wednesday 3 June. "Professor Chris O'Brien was last night admitted to Royal Prince Alfred Hospital after suffering a significant deterioration in his condition," Lifehouse said. He died on 4 June 2009, with the following episode of RPA dedicated to Professor O'Brien's work at the hospital and on the show throughout the years.

== Episodes ==
=== Season 19 (2023) ===
No. overall	No. in season	Title	Original release date	Australia viewers
N–A	1	"Episode 1"	27 March 2023	419,000
N–A	2	"Episode 2"	3 April 2023	395,000
N–A	3	"Episode 3"	10 April 2023	222,000
N–A	4	"Episode 4"	17 April 2023	274,000
N–A	5	"Episode 5"	24 April 2023	242,000
N–A	6	"Episode 6"	1 May 2023	297,000
N–A	7	"Episode 7"	15 May 2023	N/A
N–A	8	"Episode 8"	22 May 2023	N/A

=== Season 20 (2024) ===
No. overall	No. in season	Title	Original release date	Australia viewers
N–A	1	"Elio's Broken Heart"	3 October 2024	N/A

== See also ==
- Kings Cross ER: St Vincent's Hospital
- Young Doctors
- Medical Emergency
