= Young Doctors =

Australian television series

Young Doctors is an Australian factual television show that looks at the work of junior doctors at John Hunter Hospital in Newcastle, New South Wales. This eight-part observational documentary series began on the Nine Network on 26 October 2011.

== See also ==
- RPA
- Medical Emergency
