= Parabrachial nuclei =

Part of the brainstem

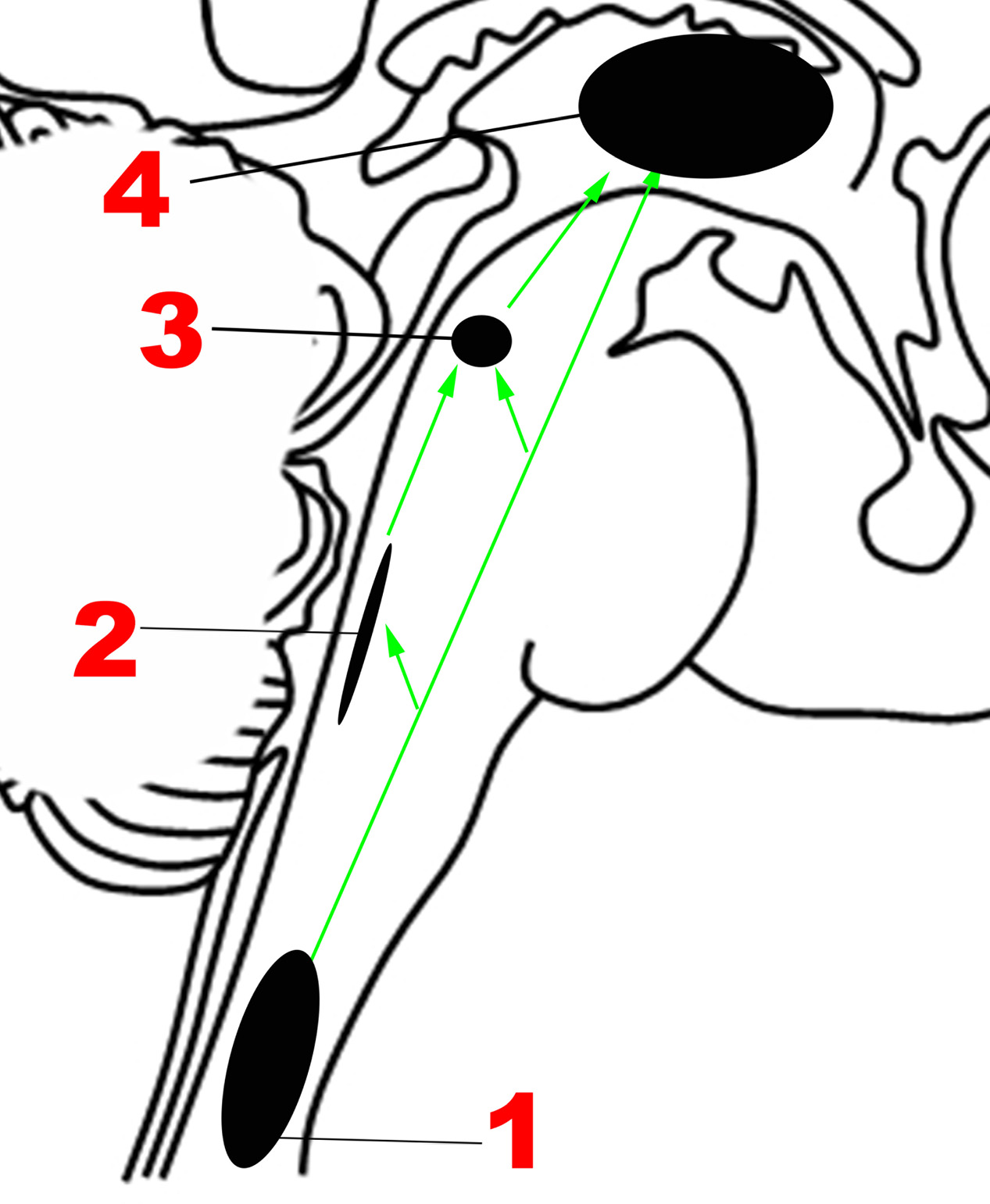
- Parabrachial nucleus at N.0 3

Details
- Part of: Brainstem
- Parts: Medial parabrachial nucleus, lateral parabrachial nucleus, subparabrachial nucleus

Identifiers
- Latin: nuclei parabrachiales
- MeSH: D065823
- NeuroNames: 1927
- NeuroLex ID: nlx_23647
- TA98: A14.1.05.439
- TA2: 5945
- FMA: 84024

The parabrachial nuclei, also known as the parabrachial complex, are a group of nuclei in the dorsolateral pons that surrounds the superior cerebellar peduncle as it enters the brainstem from the cerebellum. They are named from the Latin term for the superior cerebellar peduncle, the brachium conjunctivum. In the human brain, the expansion of the superior cerebellar peduncle expands the parabrachial nuclei, which form a thin strip of grey matter over most of the peduncle. The parabrachial nuclei are typically divided along the lines suggested by Baxter and Olszewski in humans, into a medial parabrachial nucleus and lateral parabrachial nucleus. These have in turn been subdivided into a dozen subnuclei: the superior, dorsal, ventral, internal, external and extreme lateral subnuclei; the lateral crescent and subparabrachial nucleus (Kolliker-Fuse nucleus) along the ventrolateral margin of the lateral parabrachial complex; and the medial and external medial subnuclei

== Anatomy ==
=== Structure ===
The main parabrachial nuclei are the medial parabrachial nucleus, the lateral parabrachial nucleus, and the subparabrachial nucleus. They are located at the junction of the midbrain and pons.

==== Medial parabrachial nucleus ====
The medial parabrachial nucleus relays information from the taste area of the solitary nucleus to the ventral posteromedial nucleus of the thalamus.

==== Lateral parabrachial nucleus ====
The lateral parabrachial nucleus receives information from the caudal solitary tract and transmits signals mainly to the medial hypothalamus but also to the lateral hypothalamus and many of the nuclei targeted by the medial parabrachial nucleus.

==== Subparabrachial nucleus ====
The subparabrachial nucleus (also known as the Kölliker-Fuse nucleus, or diffuse reticular nucleus) regulates the breathing rate. It receives signals from the caudal, cardio-respiratory part of the solitary nucleus and sends signals to the lower medulla oblongata, the spinal cord, the amygdala and the lateral hypothalamus.

=== Afferents and efferents ===
The parabrachial nuclei receive visceral afferent information from a variety of sources in the brainstem, including much from the solitary nucleus, which brings taste information and information about the remainder of the body.

The external, dorsal, internal and superior lateral subnuclei also receive input from the spinal and trigeminal dorsal horn, mainly concerned with pain and other visceral sensations.

Outputs from the parabrachial nucleus originate from specific subnuclei and target forebrain sites involved in autonomic regulation, including the lateral hypothalamic area, ventromedial, dorsomedial, and arcuate hypothalamic nuclei, the median and lateral preoptic nuclei, the substantia innominate, the ventroposterior parvicellular and intralaminar thalamic nuclei, the central nucleus of the amygdala, and the insular and infralimbic cortex.

The subparabrachialnucleus and lateral crescent send efferents to the nucleus of the solitary tract, ventrolateral medulla, and spinal cord, where they target many respiratory and autonomic cell groups. Many of these same brainstem and forebrain areas send efferents back to the parabrachial nucleus as well.

== Function ==
=== Arousal ===
Many subsets of neurons in the parabrachial complex that target specific forebrain or brainstem cell groups contain specific neuropeptides, and appear to carry out distinct functions. For example, a population of neurons in the external lateral parabrachial subnucleus that contain the neurotransmitter calcitonin gene-related peptide (CGRP) appears to be critical for relaying information about hypoxia (low blood oxygen) and/or hypercapnia (high blood CO_{2}) to forebrain sites to “wake up the brain” (arouse) when breathing is inadequate to meet physiological demands during sleep. This resulting “wakefulness drive to breath” contributes to prevention of asphyxia.

Recent data indicate that glutamatergic neurons in the medial and lateral parabrachial nuclei, along with glutamatergic neurons in the pedunculopontine tegmental nucleus, provide a critical node in the brainstem for producing a waking state. Lesions of these neurons cause irreversible coma.

=== Blood sugar control ===
Other neurons in the superior lateral parabrachial nucleus that contain cholecystokinin have been found to prevent hypoglycemia.

=== Thermoregulation ===
In 2008, neurons in the external lateral parabrachial nucleus were found to mediate cold sensory transmission from the skin to the preoptic area, a thermoregulatory center in the hypothalamus, to stimulate heat production in the cold. Warm sensory transmission to the preoptic area to avoid hyperthermia in hot environments is mediated by another group of neurons in the dorsal lateral parabrachial nucleus, which contain dynorphin or cholecystokinin.

A study in 2017, has shown this thermosensory information to be relayed through the lateral parabrachial nucleus rather than the thalamus, which drives thermoregulatory behavior. A thermosensory neural pathway from the lateral parabrachial nucleus to the preoptic area induces heat avoidance behavior, and another pathway to the central amygdaloid nucleus induces cold avoidance behavior.

=== Taste ===
Parabrachial neurons in rodents that relay taste information to the ventroposterior parvocellular (taste) nucleus of the thalamus are mainly CGRP neurons in the external medial parabrachial nucleus and they project predominantly contralaterally, as well as a smaller number in the ventral lateral nucleus, which project mainly ipsilaterally.

Neurons that mediate the sensation of itching, connect to the parabrachial nucleus by way of glutamatergic spinal projection neurons. This pathway triggers scratching in mice.

=== Pleasure ===
The parabrachial nucleus relays satiety and pain-related signals to higher brain regions; when inhibited, this can produce "liking" responses to certain pleasurable stimuli, such as sweet taste.

=== Wet dog shakes ===
The lateral parabrachial nucleus integrates sensory signals, primarily, but not exclusively, from low-threshold mechanoreceptors to initiate the wet dog shake behavior by which mammals remove water and irritants from their back and neck fur. It receives this mechanoreceptor input from group C nerve fibers that connect to spinoparabrachial neurons in the spinal cord.
