= Derek Denton =

Australian scientist (1924–2022)

Derek Denton AC FRS
- Born: 27 May 1924; Launceston, Tasmania, Australia
- Died: 18 November 2022 (aged 98)
- Education: University of Melbourne
- Spouse: Dame Margaret Scott (m. 1953; died 2019)
- Children: 2
- Awards: Macfarlane Burnet Medal and Lecture; Order of Australia
- Scientific career
- Fields: Animal consciousness

Derek Ashworth Denton AC FRS (27 May 1924 – 18 November 2022) was an Australian scientist who elucidated the regulation of electrolytes in extracellular fluid, the hormones controlling this regulation, particularly aldosterone, and the instinctive behaviours controlling intake of water and salts. He was cited in 1995 at election to the U.S. National Academy of Sciences as the world’s leading authority on the regulation of salt and water metabolism and relevant endocrine control mechanisms. He was one of Australia’s most eminent scientists.

== Career ==
Denton was the founding Director and Emeritus Director of the Howard Florey Institute, Honorary Professor at the University of Melbourne and a consultant at the Baker Research Institute. Denton's last book is The Primordial Emotions: The Dawning of Consciousness.

== Research ==
Three months after medical graduation in 1947, he made a basic discovery on kidney function at the Royal Melbourne Hospital. In the face of profuse alkaline drainage (Na+ in excess of Cl- relative to extracellular proportions) from a pancreatic fistula (2-3 litres/day) the patient’s kidneys primarily regulated the ionic pattern of the extra cellular fluid – not plasma concentration or the load of ions to the kidney tubules. As the fistula drained, blood pressure declined, respiration increased, and Cl- excretion in urine increased despite decline in plasma Cl- level below the so called “renal threshold “. Adequate intravenous infusion of sodium lactate, or oral sodium bicarbonate reduced or stopped the urinary Cl- excretion. In this era, urinary Cl- was measured at the bedside (Fantus test) to assess whether salt content of the body was adequate or whether salt administration was needed urgently. This was recommended by Marriott in his Croonian Lecture and was the practice of the British Army in India. The proposal was physiologically unsound in specific circumstances of loss of Na in excess of Cl, and Marriott altered his recommendations. It was the wrong approach in diseases such as e.g. dysentery, cholera and paralytic ileus. No rapid estimation of urinary sodium by flame photometry had yet emerged.

Denton recognised also a crucial biological fact that no biologically relatively inactive cation had evolved in Metazoan organisms to play a role analogous to that which increase of bicarbonate plays on the anion side of the pattern during vomiting and excess Cl- loss. In this latter case no large urinary Na excretion was obligatory to keep acid-base balance compatible with life. The initial finding with pancreatic fistula was published by Nature (London, 1948). In 1949, he, and Dr Victor Wynn who had joined him in study of a second case, were supported by Professor R. D. Wright and Sir MacFarlane Burnet to set up the Ionic Research Unit of the NHMRC in the Physiology Department at Melbourne University. The Ionic Research Unit originated flame photometry in clinical medical practice internationally – a Wynn initiated step. Rapid measurement of sodium and potassium in blood and urine helped originate intensive care, and they published a monograph in Acta Medica Scandinavica. Denton and Wynn’s approach, particularly flame photometry with rapid assessment of biochemical disorder, eventually resulted in saving of tens of thousands of lives in Australia as well as in other countries by chemically accurate intervention. In 1952 Wynn went to London, where Professors Pickering and Robb at St Mary’s Hospital established a metabolic intensive care unit which Wynn directed. Some years later he was visited by Professor Francis Moore of Harvard who incorporated the Melbourne classification of distortion of body fluid status viz subtraction acidemia e.g. pancreatic fistula; addition acidemia e.g. diabetic coma; subtraction alkalemia e.g. vomiting gastric juice; and addition alkalemia (excess alkali ingestion) into his textbook ‘Metabolic Aspects of Surgery”

Denton, in Melbourne, directed his efforts to basic physiological processes involved in regulation of body fluids.

Fifty years had passed since Pavlov was using Pavlov-Glinski parotid fistulae in dogs with discovery of conditioned reflexes. Nine papers from Russia and Germany had reported in the interim that a permanent unilateral parotid fistula was not surgically feasible in ruminants. Denton succeeded surgically in sheep which opened a new era in the study of body fluid regulation. In effect, the parotid fistula (1-4l/day) represented a tap on the blood stream letting out sodium. Many animal preparations made also embodied his novel idea of adrenal autotransplant into arterio-venous skin loops constructed in the neck, as executed by Wright and Goding. This allowed revelation of direct action on the gland by adrenal arterial infusion of e.g. Na, K, ACTH in a conscious undisturbed animal. Following the discovery of the salt retaining hormone aldosterone by the Taits in 1953, with major medical implications, the hunt for the mode of control of it was internationally intense.

Following the Australian Group finding of a specific but limited role of Na, K and ACTH, cross circulation experiments by Denton, Goding and Wright discovered an unidentified humoral agent in aldosterone control, and contemporaneously Davis and Peterson at NIH made a similar finding in anaesthetized dogs. (subsequently angiotensin II was indicted – Ganong, Mulrow)). Denton and colleagues showed direct action of Angiotensin II on the adrenal by arterial infusion. The operative idea of the cervical autotransplant was later applied internationally to ovary and uterus, and the parathyroid, thyroid, pancreas, and in Melbourne to the kidney.

=== Evolutionary implications ===
Continuous parotid fistula secretion (1-4 litres daily) contrived severe Na depletion rapidly in sheep. Salivary Na/K ratio of 170/10 changed dramatically over days to 10/160 as a result of adrenal secretion of aldosterone. Thus K, abundant in vegetation, could be used in the digestive life cycle for months. This evolutionary advantageous process allowed use of the Na content of the rumen “reservoir” to support the circulation, and reproduction – foetal tissues and lactation. Thus, herbivores invaded and reproduced in the vast Na depleted interior of continents, alps, deserts and jungles. Their historic evidence of severe sodium depletion in native and introduced species of wild animals in the Alps in Australia was ratified by direct measurement of peripheral blood aldosterone with a double isotope dilution method set up by Dr John Coghlan of the Ionic Unit following his study with Professor Ralph Peterson in New York. The discovery of severe Na depletion of animals in the Alps of Australia was confirmed in camels in the desert in Africa by Knut Schmidit-Nielsen, and in moose in Canada by Jordan and Botkin. Hitherto salt depletion had been inferred by the attraction of animals to salt. Meteorological data had shown that by 150-200 Km from the ocean coast rainwater is devoid of Na containing marine aerosols, and thus vast areas of the planet are Na depleted.

With regard to the HCO_{3} ion, Denton recognised early that data showing that alligators, with their swallowing of whole large prey and having plasma HCO3 rise from 40 to 100 mmol/litre, and Cl decrease from 100 to 40 mmol/litre with blood pH near 7.8 reflected a basic mechanism in the pathway of evolution of the constrictors and big reptiles. They passed a major portion of their extracellular CL- content into their stomach as HCl to digest prey over very many days.

Denton suggested also that the endocannibalism recognized by Alfred Russel Wallace in the vast Na depleted regions of the Amazon Basin reflected conservation by the tribes of very scarce minerals of critical importance.

With Hird and Reich, Denton showed the monotremes platypus and echidna were ureotelic which underlined biochemical changes crucial for mammalian evolution.

The months following graduation (1947), and the responsibility for the patient with a pancreatic fistula, led to study sojourns with Frank Fenner and Macfarlane Burnet in Melbourne, and Verney in Cambridge, UK in 1952. On return from the UK, Denton’s discoveries starting from the two fistula patients, and several sheep in cages progressively revealed novel renal, endocrine and instinctive behavioural mechanisms of notable medical, integrative physiological, and evolutionary survival importance.

=== Australian and International Recognition of the Investigation ===
The work attracted large financial support from private benefactors in Australia (Kenneth and Baillieu Myer, and Sir Ian Potter) and overseas, the Australian Government and Reserve Bank, the Rockefeller Foundation, and the National Institutes of Health (US). This founded and supported the Howard Florey Laboratories in 1962, and then in 1970, the Howard Florey Institute of Experimental Physiology and Medicine, which has eventually become the largest neuroscience institute in the Southern Hemisphere (The Florey Institute of Neuroscience and Mental Health – 600 personnel). He was the Founding Director and was termed by the Chancellor of Melbourne University, Professor Sir Douglas Wright AK, as the “fons et origo”. Election by the Royal Swedish Academy of Science (1974) as one of 18 Foreign Medical Members, joining, inter alia, Lord Adrian, Hodgkin, A.V. Hill, Burnet, Monod, Best, Bronk, Page and Moruzzi. One of 4 OECD Examiners of Scientific Policy of the Government of Sweden in 1986. For twelve years (1978-1991) he was with Professor Sune Bergstrom, Chairman of the Nobel Foundation, one of two foreign members of the Lasker Jury in the U.S. He became a Council Member (1977-1989), and then First Vice President of the International Union of Physiological Sciences (1983-1989), working with President, Sir Andrew Huxley PRS. Australian representative on the International Human Rights Network of Academies and Learned Societies, 2000-2015.

Following election to the Royal Swedish Academy of Science in 1974, Denton received the Pavlovian Award of the Pavlovian Society of North America for achievement toward understanding of factors in normal and abnormal behaviour (1975), and together with colleagues at the Howard Florey, the Biennial Prize of the International Society of Cardiology in 1976. In 1979 he was elected Fellow of the Australian Academy of Science, and also the Royal Australian College of Physicians. In 1982 awarded the P K Anokhin Medal by the Rector of the Schenov First Moscow Medical Institute “for contribution to world physiology”. In 1986 elected as Honorary Foreign Member of the American Academy of Arts and Sciences. In 1987 elected Honorary Member, American Physiological Society, one of 50 so elected in the Society’s century of function. In 1988, elected Honorary Fellow, Royal College of Physicians (London). In 1995, elected Foreign Associate National Academy of Sciences USA. In 1999 elected Fellow of the Royal Society (London), and in 2000 elected Foreign Associate, Académie des Sciences, Institut de France. In 2001 he received the Life Time Achievement Award of the International Commission on Food and Fluid Intake of the International Union of Physiological Sciences. In 2005 and 2006, he received a Companion of the Order of Australia, and Doctor of Law (Honoris Causa) University of Melbourne, and in 2014 the World Hypertension League Award for Excellence in Dietary Salt Reduction.

At election to the Academy of Science of the Institute of France, the same attribution of world leadership, that the Academy of Science of the US made was reiterated and the Danish group, Paul Astrup, Peter Bie and Hans Enzell in their book “Salt and Water in Culture and Medicine” (1993) stated “Australian Derek Ashworth Denton has contributed more than anyone in explaining the adrenal production of hormones and their importance in the regulation of salt metabolism”.

Denton synthesised a sweep of this work in his book "The Hunger for Salt: An Anthropological, Physiological and Medical Analysis" (Springer Verlag 1982) which was reviewed by Lewis Thomas, President of the Sloan Kettering Institute, nominated by Time to be "...the best essayist on science now working anywhere in the world." Thomas wrote "...few researchers have the intellectual flexibility or the sheer courage to take on a really big subject and cover the whole. Derek Denton has done this in “Hunger for Salt”, and the result is something astonishing among contemporary scientific letters – a single author book that covers everything – This grand book", and by Harold Schmeck, lead Science Writer of the New York Times, as ".may be the most comprehensive treatment of the subject ever completed", Dr. John Pappenheimer, the Emeritus Professor of Physiology at Harvard, characterized it as "...the best example of integrative physiology to come of the second half of the 20th century."

Fierce controversies on the role of excess salt intake as a major cause of hypertension in humans were rampant in the second half of the twentieth century. The issue was clouded by citation of multiple factors possible and the role of the Salt Institute in Washington, an industry funded body. At the primate research centre of the Texas Biomedical Institute in San Antonio, Eichberg and Shade showed humans closest relatives, chimpanzees, fed a diet with Na content equivalent to urban humans showed characteristic population blood pressure rise with age. Denton located a population of chimpanzees at the Institute of Primate Research at Franceville, Gabon, approximately 100 km further up the Ouguie river than Dr Schweitzer’s Hospital at Lamborene in Equatorial Africa. The Franceville chimpanzees received essentially a vegetarian-fruit diet providing 5-10 mmol of Na per day. Twelve were continued on the diet and twelve others had sodium added to the same diet via a protein supplement drink given to both groups. Initially, mean blood pressure of both groups was characteristic of agricultural society (circa 120/50 mm of Hg) but with the increase of Na intake up to 15g/day over 1.5 years, which reflected intake in Akita province of Northern Japan (a region of high incidence of hypertension) mean systolic blood pressure had increased by 33 mmHg and diastolic by 10mmHg . By 20 weeks after ceasing salt supplement, the blood pressure had reversed to initial control level baseline. With publication and editorial in Nature Medicine, the New York Times cited it as a decisive one variable experiment and Denton, accompanied by the Editor of Nature Medicine presented a Lecture on it to the FDA in Washington. He was notified later that the Salt Institute had withdrawn a Citizens Petition to the FDA proposing cessation of designation of sodium content of foods in the USA which probably would have influenced many other countries. Denton had already persuaded Heinz in Australia to cease adding salt to baby food.

From the outset of preparation of sheep with a permanent parotid fistula in 1953 it was evident that the animals vigorously licked any dried saliva on the walls of their cages and attacked a salt block placed in their cage. A clear-cut avid appetite for salt was evident, and opened a new way to investigate the neural organization of a classic instinct. Elaborating the general biological context, Denton showed that sodium was a rate limiting factor in reproduction, especially in animals with multiple litters, and that in pregnancy and lactation increased secretion of a quintet of steroid and peptide hormones caused a large increase of salt appetite.

His area of study focused on the instincts and their associated primordial emotions, such as hunger for air, food hunger, thirst, pain, sexual desire, specific mineral appetites, the search for a temperature-compatible environment, and the need for sleep after deprivation. When fully active, these subjective elements of instinct create a goal-directed intention that can dominate the stream of consciousness.

Denton showed that sodium appetite is innate, specific for sodium salts, and separate from thirst, as shown by brain lesion and behavioural studies. There is clearly a genetically determined neural organization subserving gratification of sodium appetite. He showed in certain species the genesis of appetite involves response to reduction of brain intracellular sodium concentration whereas in others the hormone Angiotensin II, released as a result of reduction of blood volume, is the initiating stimulus and its antagonist losartan will reduce or abolish appetite. The appetite can be rapidly gratified by eating or drinking of salt by animals in the wild, akin to the rapid gratification of thirst, rapidity being of high survival value. It reduces the chances of being killed by predators lying in wait. The hormonal cascade initiated by stress and ACTH was shown also to cause a large sodium appetite.

In parallel, his oesophageal fistula studies of thirst and sodium appetite and its gratification conducted with his colleagues, Elspeth Bott, Michael McKinley, Eva Tarjan, and Richard Weisinger revealed the role of the 5th, 7th, 9th and 10th cranial nerves as a chronological sequence contriving gratification. Neuroimaging has shown also a novel mechanism involved in the inhibiting of fluid intake when adequate has already been ingested. At this time, the Florey Group led by McKinley showed the site of Verney’s osmoreceptor was outside the blood-brain-barrier in the lamina terminalis.

Investigations in collaboration with Professor Wolfgang Liedtke of Duke University, USA (2011) examined gene expression in the hypothalamus of mice associated with Na appetite, and its abolition by rapid voluntary intake of salt solution before the time of significant absorption from the gut. Na deficiency caused up regulation of hypothalamic genes, including dopamine and cAMP regulated neuronal phosphoprotein 32 kDA (DARPP-32), dopamine receptors 1 and 2 and STEP. Administration of D1and D2 receptor antagonists reduced gratification. The gene sets were gene sets previously linked to addiction (opiates and cocaine). Salt appetite and gratification are evident in Metatheria (e.g. kangaroos) which evolved more than 100 million years ago, whereas drugs of addiction are recent. This raised the question whether contemporary hedonic indulgence and addiction has utilized ancient neural pathways and receptors of instinct processes, which may explain the many difficulties in treatment.

Beginning with studies on the regulation of body fluids, Denton's later research focused on the evolution and biological basis of consciousness. His work proposed that consciousness evolved because it conferred a significant survival advantage, and that the nervous system was shaped through natural selection. He argued that the primordial emotions constitute the subjective component of instincts, providing a powerful motivational drive toward specific goals, and that innate sensory stimuli act as releasing mechanisms for instinctive consummatory behaviours. In developing these ideas, Denton drew on William James's The Principles of Psychology (1890), particularly James's observation that "it has been impossible to keep [instincts] separate from the emotional excitements which go with them."

As well as the central issue of genetically programmed behaviour, Denton has studied also higher cognitive function in chimpanzees – explicitly self-awareness. Hitherto it was established by Gallup and others that chimpanzees used mirror reflections to examine otherwise visually inaccessible parts of the body e.g. genitalia or arm pit.

The proposal is that you cannot use mirrors to do this unless you know who you are – i.e. you are self-aware. Denton has elaborated this by showing chimpanzees their reflection in distorting “circus mirrors” where they will appear either very fat, or very tall and thin – quite unlike any chimpanzee they had ever seen, or their own reflection as seen in a mirror. It emerged that the chimpanzees had the cognitive capacity to abstract. By swaying from side to side, they established that the distorted reflection moved contemporaneously with their own volitional movement. Thus it was themselves, and they rapidly lost interest. The observation focuses whether “cause and effect” was understood as a discernible natural law or reality of the external world by the animal brain.

The Howard Florey Institute of Physiology and Medicine has been a leader in long-term survival experiments on large animals and was characterized by the National Institutes of Health Washington, as probably the best facility in the world for this type of experiment.

Apart from striking new knowledge on the brain sensors (sodium appetite) and organization of primordial emotions entrained, such as, for example, thirst, salt appetite or hunger for air, his work has led to a theory proposing that the primordial emotions, the subjective elements of the instincts, were phylogenetically the first emergence of consciousness, often instigated by dedicated interoceptors. This hypothesis is set out comprehensively in a book “The Primordial Emotions : The Dawning of Consciousness", published by Flammarion, Paris, 2005, and Oxford University Press 2006.

=== The Analysis of Instinctive Behaviour ===
During the past twenty years, Denton’s studies increasingly have concerned the issue of the evolutionary emergence of consciousness and his proposal that the primordial emotions, the subjective elements of the instincts were the beginning of consciousness. The experimental work included the first neuroimaging of thirst with the Melbourne group, including Gary Egan, Michael Farrell and Michael McKinley, working with Peter Fox and colleagues at the Research Imaging Centre in San Antonio. The early concentration on the instincts subserving the vegetative systems e.g. thirst and hunger for air highlighted the imperious arousal compulsive of intention, which is apt for survival of the organism. Imaging revealed an important role of the midcingulate (BA32) and insula in the consciousness of thirst, and also that of midbrain structures. Latest discoveries, reported in PNAS with Pascal Saker as lead author have included the identification of a mechanism inhibiting swallowing in the situation of complicit over-drinking of water by subjects following immediate earlier adequate volitional satiation of thirst. The complicit over-drinking evokes an unpleasant aversive subjective sensation and probably reflects evolutionary emergence of protection against surfeit, and its hyponatraemic dangers.

Denton hypothesized that early in animal evolution complex reflex mechanisms located in the basal brain subserving responses with a homeostatic outcome, in concert with elements of the reticular activating system subserving arousal, melded functionally with regions embodied in the progressive rostral development of the telencephalon. This included the emergent limbic and paralimbic areas, and the insula. This phylogenetically ancient organization subserved the origin of consciousness as the primordial emotion, which signalled that the organisms existence was immediately threatened. Neuroimaging confirms major activations in regions of the basal brain during primordial emotions in humans. The behaviour of decorticate humans and animals is important in relation to the possible existence of primitive awareness.

Neuroimaging of the primordial emotions reveals that rapid gratification of goal directed intention by a consummatory act such as ingestion causes precipitate decline of both the initiating sensation and the intention. There is contemporaneous rapid disappearance of particular regions of brain activation which suggests they may be part of the jointly sufficient and severally necessary activations and deactivations which correlate with consciousness.

== Personal life and death ==
Denton was married to pioneering ballet dancer and teacher Dame Margaret Scott from 1953 until her death in 2019. They had two sons.

Denton died on 18 November 2022, at the age of 98.

== Awards and honours ==
In 1995, on election to the National Academy of Sciences, he was cited as "the world's leading authority on the regulation of salt and water metabolism and relevant endocrine control mechanisms". He was also exploring the nature of consciousness in animals. In 1987 he was awarded the Macfarlane Burnet Medal and Lecture by the Australian Academy of Science for his lifetime's work and in 1999 elected a Fellow of the Royal Society of London.

Denton was made a Companion of the Order of Australia in 2005 for leadership in medical research.
