= Arthur Craig =

American neuroanatomist and neuroscientist (1951–2023)

Arthur Dewitt "Bud" Craig, Jr. (August 31, 1951 – July 15, 2023) was an American neuroanatomist and neuroscientist.

== Career ==
Craig attended Michigan State University from which he earned the Bachelor of Science degree in mathematics in June 1973. He completed his doctorate degree at Cornell University, in Ithaca, New York, in neurophysiology, neuroanatomy, and electrical engineering and received a Ph.D. in January 1978. He worked with Daniel N. Tapper, Ph.D. on electrophysiology of somatosensory processing in the spinal cord. The title of his thesis was "Anatomic and Electrophysiologic Studies on the Lateral Cervical Nucleus in Cat and Dog".

== Research ==
Following graduate school, Craig spent two years in the department of physiology and biophysics at Washington University School of Medicine in St. Louis, Missouri, as a post-doctoral fellow, and one year in the department of anatomy and neurobiology as research associate.

In 1981 he moved to Germany to become "Wissenschaftlicher Assistent" (research associate) in the department of physiology at the University of Kiel and then in 1983 Akademischer Rat auf Zeit (research assistant professor) at the University of Würzburg in the department of physiology. In 1986 Craig joined Barrow Neurological Institute (BNI) to direct the Atkinson Pain Research Laboratory

== Recognition ==
Craig was a recipient of the National Merit Scholarship Award (1968–1973). He was awarded with Doctor of Medicine (MD), honoris causa, from Linköping University in 2001. He received the Kenneth Craik Award in Experimental Psychology from the University of Cambridge in 2002. In 2011, Craig received the Frederic W. L. Kerr Award from the American Pain Society and was elected to be a foreign member of Royal Society of Sciences and Letters in Gothenburg.

Craig held appointments as research professor in the department of cell biology and anatomy at the University of Arizona College of Medicine and in the department of psychology at Arizona State University.
