= Joris Jorissen Frese =

- Occupation: City architect (Stadtbaumeister) of Riga
- Years active: 1565–1602

Joris Jorissen Frese or Jorris Jorriszn Frese (active c. 1565–1602) was a Dutch or Frisian Renaissance-era architect, sculptor, and building master who served as the official city architect (Stadtbaumeister) of Riga during the late 16th century. His work marks the introduction of Renaissance architectural forms into the urban landscape of Riga and played a role in both its defensive and ecclesiastical development during a period of political and military upheaval.

Joris Jorissen Frese’s work helped transition Riga from medieval to early modern architectural aesthetics, blending military necessity with Renaissance elegance.

== Early life and arrival in Riga ==
Nothing definitive is known about Frese's birth or early life. His surname, "Frese", suggests origins in Friesland, either in the northern Netherlands or the German region of East Frisia (Ostfriesland). By 1565, Frese had arrived in Riga from Bremen, Germany, identifying himself initially as a joiner and sculptor. This reflects the typical Northern European career path of builders at the time—starting with training in wood carving, sculpture, or decorative arts, and eventually transitioning to architecture under a master’s guidance.

In a 1569 letter to the Riga Town Council, Frese claimed to have traveled extensively and worked for multiple patrons and cities prior to settling in Riga, though he gave no details about these experiences.

== Work ==
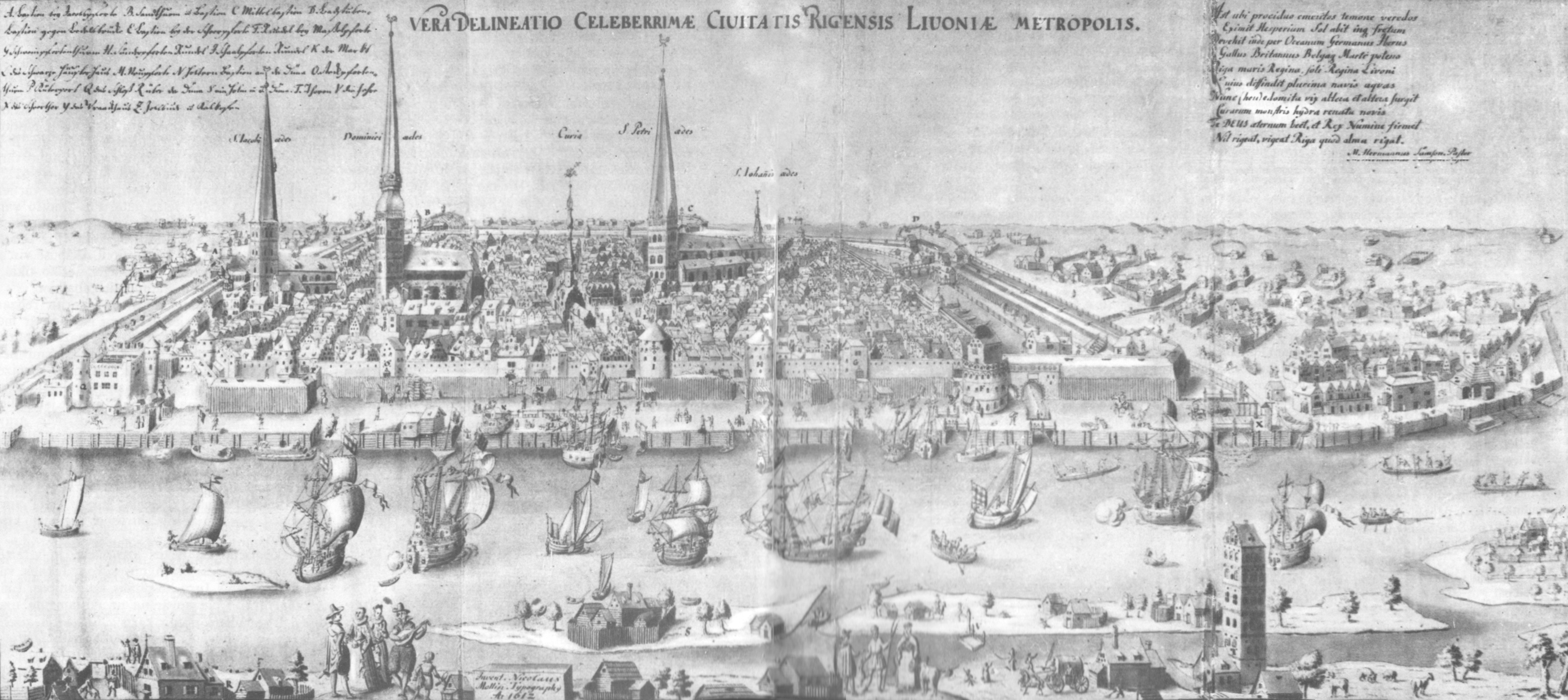
Riga 1612 panorama by Heinrich Thum

Following the death of city architect Hans Ries in 1564, the Riga City Council requested Frese to assess and provide recommendations for improving the city’s fortifications. This came during the Livonian War, a time when Riga faced military threats and the need for improved defenses. On 21 January 1567, Frese presented proposals for fortifying the harbor side of Riga, including the redesign of the Mārstaļi Gate and the construction of a new Harbour Gate (Hafentor) where the Rīdzene stream flowed into the Daugava River.

Frese’s detailed plans included foundational masonry using precisely cut stones, upper walls built with high-quality bricks, and iron-reinforced doors. These plans were accompanied by drawings, now lost, though elements of his design are believed to be visible in a 1612 engraving by Nikolaus Mollyn.

The Harbour Gate's architecture, with its dual arches for foot and river traffic, ornate frieze featuring lions' heads and rosettes, and the probable placement of a chronostic inscription, demonstrates the influence of Renaissance styles and marks one of Riga's earliest expressions of the period’s architectural language.

=== Appointment as city architect ===
Frese applied for the official post of Riga’s city architect in 1569, stating his qualifications and need for work during wartime. He was officially appointed to the position only in 1576, following several years of unofficial work. During this interim, he had also worked for the ducal court in Jelgava (Mitau), the capital of the Duchy of Courland and Semigallia. There, he contributed to the construction of the ducal residence, a chapel, and two Lutheran churches: St. Anne’s Church (Latvian community, 1573) and the Holy Trinity Church (German community, 1574). These churches shared notable architectural similarities in layout, façade composition, and decorative brickwork.

=== Projects and legacy ===
Once confirmed as city architect, Frese remained active in Riga for approximately 25 years, working as a military engineer, designer of public infrastructure, and ecclesiastical architect. He contributed to city defenses during the attacks by Ivan the Terrible in 1577–1578, reconstructed drinking water canals in 1582 to provide clean water for both culinary and hygienic use, and oversaw the rebuilding of the spire of St. Peter’s Church in 1578.

Between 1587 and 1589, Frese was involved in designing church towers, including the Riga Cathedral spire, and choir and exterior of the St. John's Church. This tower featured an elaborate design with a platform and balustrade, a domed base, an open colonnade, and a soaring gilded spire topped with a rooster. Though destroyed in the fire of 1773, historical descriptions attest to its architectural sophistication.

He is often credited with the introduction of a fresh water supply system in 1582, known as the Wasserkunst. This system transported water from the Jugla River to public fountains via pipelines, marking a significant advancement in urban infrastructure for the city. Following this, Riga established a dedicated municipal office to oversee the urban water supply.

== Death and succession ==
Frese’s name last appears in Riga’s municipal records in 1602. That year, Lambert Janssen from The Hague began working under his supervision as a bricklayer. After Frese’s presumed death, Janssen and Adrian Janssen temporarily filled both roles until Bernt Boddecker (also known as Bötticher) was appointed as the new city architect.
