= Obluda =

Obluda is a surname.

== Etymology ==
The surname Obluda may be found among the various towns and hamlets of Neidenburg, Ostpreussen Germany from the early 17th until the early 20th century. During this time period, the region experienced many changes of national borders. Typically these changes came from a tug-of war between nations, at various times being a possession of either Russia, Germany, or Poland. Today, the region falls within Polish borders, being known as Olsztyn, Poland.

== Pronunciation ==
The exact origin and meaning of the name are currently unknown. However, in the original Polish pronunciation of the surname, the 'l' was pronounced as a 'w', thus sounding more like Obwuda than Obluda.

== Notes ==
1. In Czech meaning: "monstrum".
2. Also a picture book created by one of the characters in the manga series "Monster"
3. Dzem-Obluda is an influential blues/rock band in Poland.
