= Daniel Hermann (disambiguation) =

Daniel Hermann (born 1986) is a German former ice dancer.

Daniel Hermann or Daniel Herman can also refer to:

- Daniel Hermann (humanist) (1543–1601), Polish humanist
- Daniel Herman (publisher) (born 1957), American attorney and publisher
- Daniel Herman (born 1963), Czech politician
