= Frese =

Frese is a surname.

Notable people with this surname include:

- Brenda Frese, American basketball player
- Christel Frese, German athlete
- Dolores Warwick Frese, American medievalist
- Frederick Frese, American psychologist
- Marsha Frese, American basketball player
- Martin Frese, Danish football player
- Nolan Frese, American American football player
- Ralph Frese, American conservationist
- Ralph von Frese, American geophysicist
- Randy Frese, American politician
- Udo Frese, German academic
