= Heinrich Thome =

German military engineer and cartographer

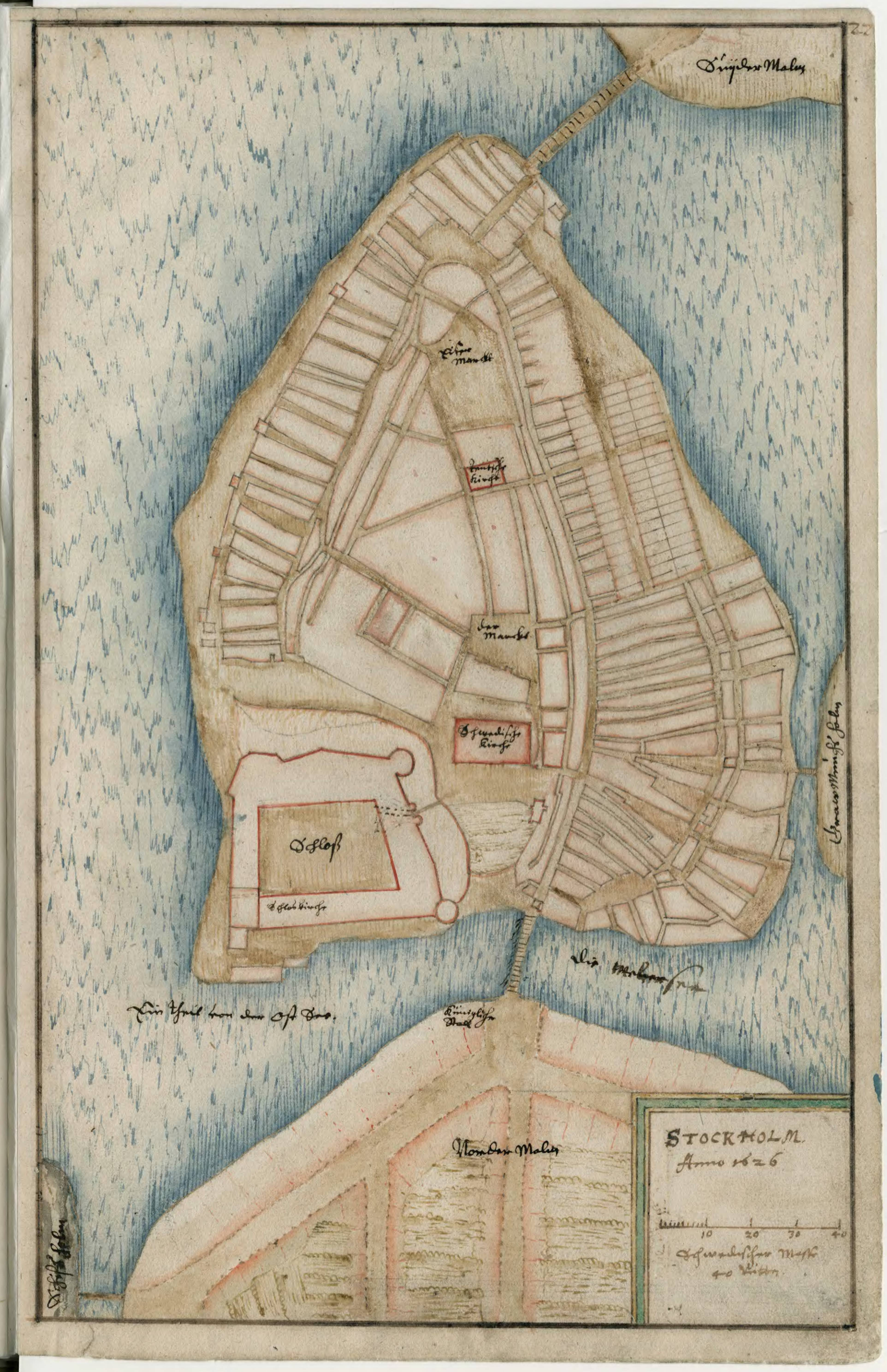
Thomé's 1626 map of Gamla stan shows the newly planned area with narrow, regular blocks where the Great Stockholm Fire of 1625 had ravaged. North is downward on the map.

Heinrich Thome, also spelled Heinrich Thomé, and in other sources Heinrich Thum, was a German military engineer and cartographer in Swedish service around 1624–1635. His birth and death years are unknown.

Thome likely originated from West Prussia and was hired as an engineer by Gustav Horn around 1624. Among his early assignments was marking out a customs fence around Jönköping. A map of Gothenburg from 1624 is included in his atlas, as well as a 1625 map of Kalmar. In 1626, he completed a city plan (now held in the Military Archives of Sweden) for Gamla stan in Stockholm, where the Great Stockholm Fire of 1625 had destroyed large parts of the southwestern district. His proposed city plan is considered the oldest preserved regulatory map of Stockholm and represents the first organized urban planning undertaken in the city.

From 1626, Thome served as an engineer in the Swedish army in Prussia, where he constructed fortifications in locations such as Pillau (now Baltiysk), Elbing (now Elbląg) and Marienburg (now Malbork), and produced a map titled "Ein Theil Preussens" ("A Part of Prussia").

After 1635, he appears to have left Swedish service and entered (or possibly re-entered) Polish service, as the book in which he compiled his maps and fortification drawings was later found in Warsaw during Charles X Gustav's war and is now preserved in the Swedish Military Archives.

== See also ==
- Nikolaus Mollyn
