= Nidzica Castle =

Castle in Nidzica, Poland

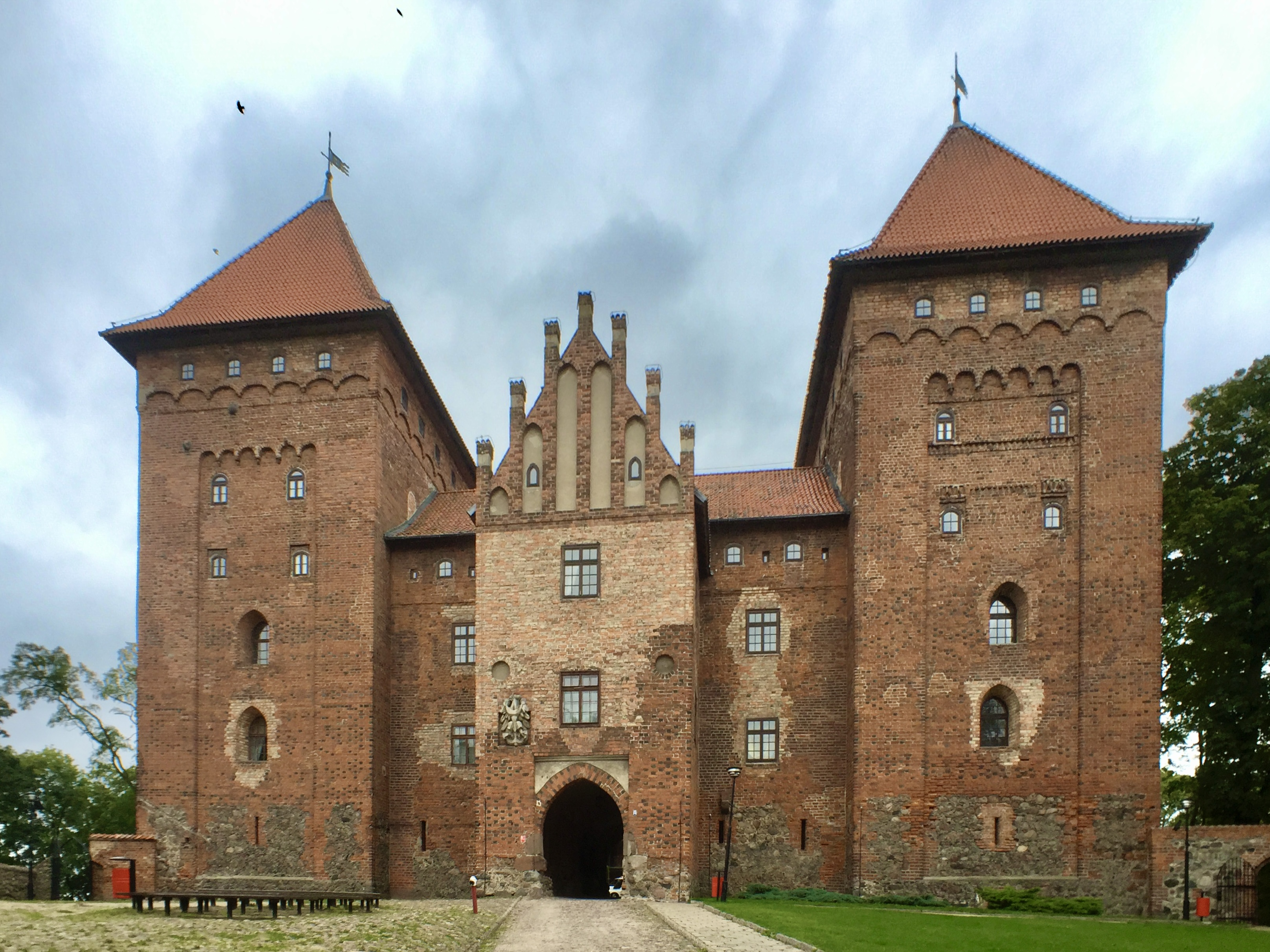
- Main entrance

- Location within Poland
- 53.3597°N 20.4291°E
- Location: Nidzica, Poland

History
- Built: 14th century

Site notes
- Architectural style: Gothic

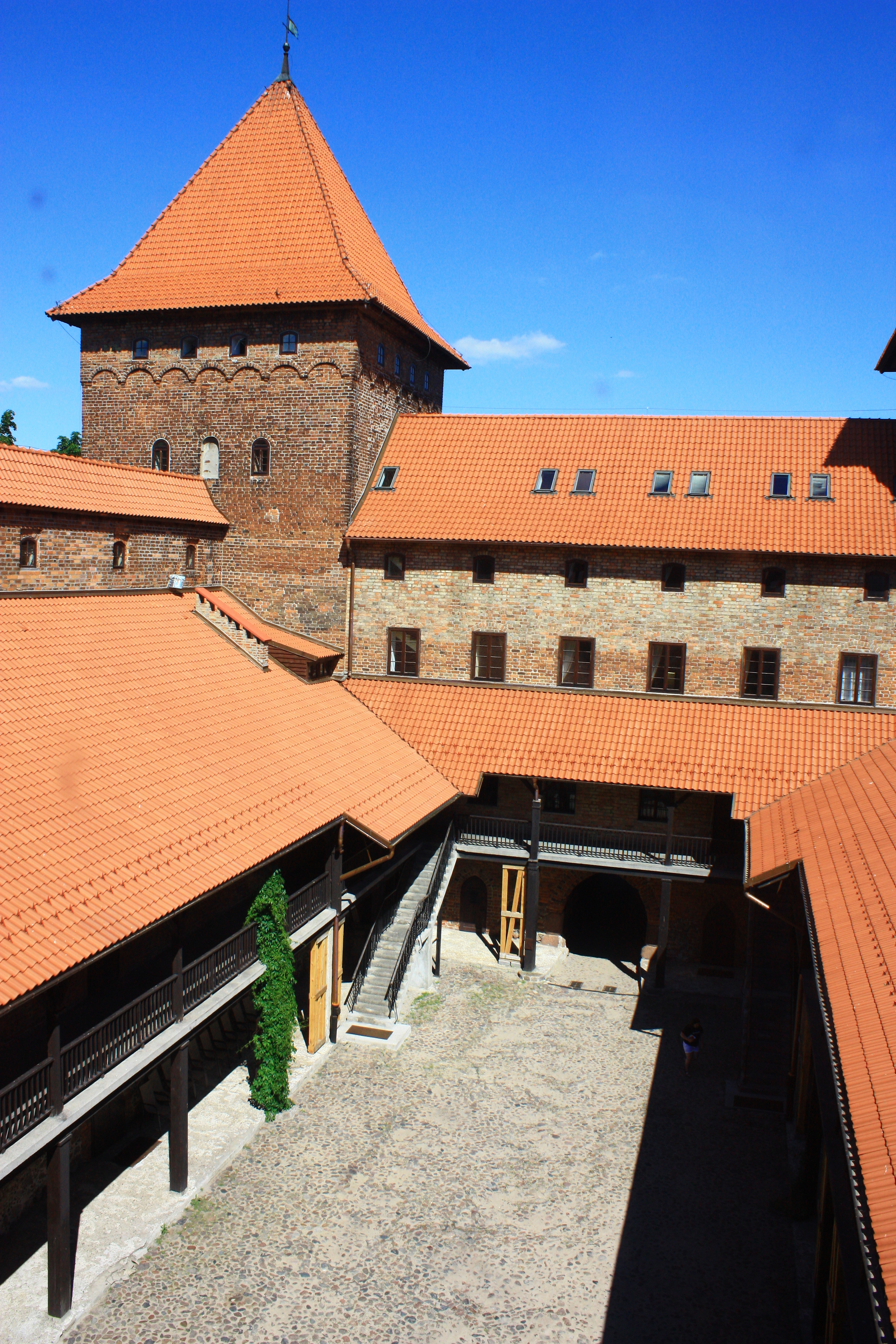
Courtyard

Nidzica Castle is a 14th-century brick Gothic Teutonic castle located in the town of Nidzica, Poland.

The construction of the castle was begun around 1370. The Pfleger of the Teutonic Knights made it his residence in 1409. On 12 July 1410, the undefended castle was captured by the Polish forces on their way into the interior of the State of the Teutonic Order. At the time of the Hunger War of 1414 the castle was put under siege by the Polish knights and taken after eight days on the 6th of July. In 1454 the castle was occupied by the Prussian Confederation and in February 1455 was taken by the Czech army led by Jan Kolda ze Zampachu, who had repulsed an attack by the forces of the Teutonic Knights on 28 April. In 1517 the inner ward was built up and reinforced.

In 1784 a fire consumed the inner ward. In 1812 the castle was devastated by Napoleon's French forces. The castle was rebuilt from 1828 to 1830 into a court and a prison. In 1945, during the Second World War, the Soviet army bombarded the castle. In the aftermath of the Potsdam Conference, the area was ceded to Poland; much of the castle remained in ruins until reconstruction between 1961 and 1965.

== See also ==
- Castles in Poland
