= St. John's Church, Riga =

St. John's Church
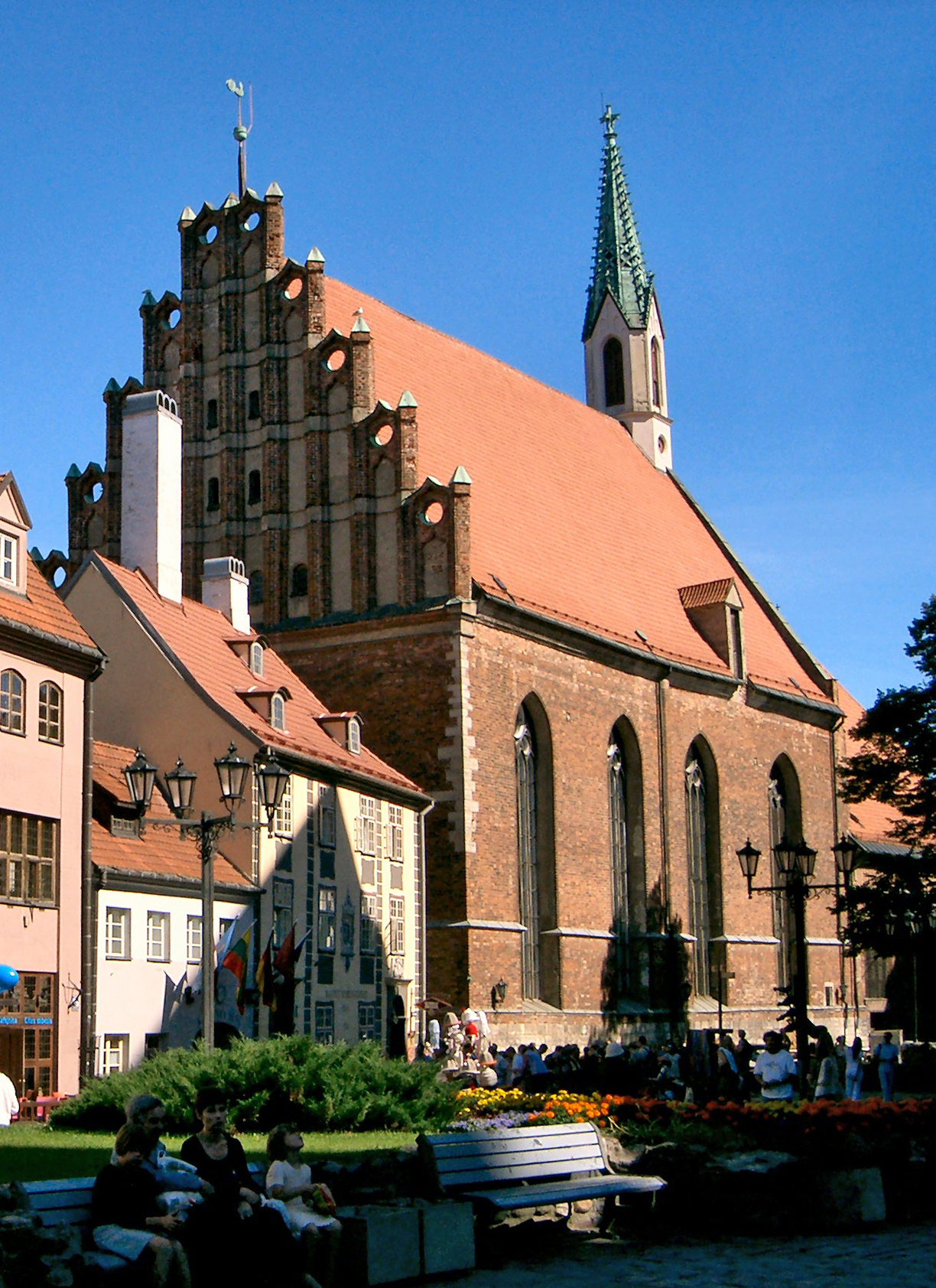
- St. John's Church

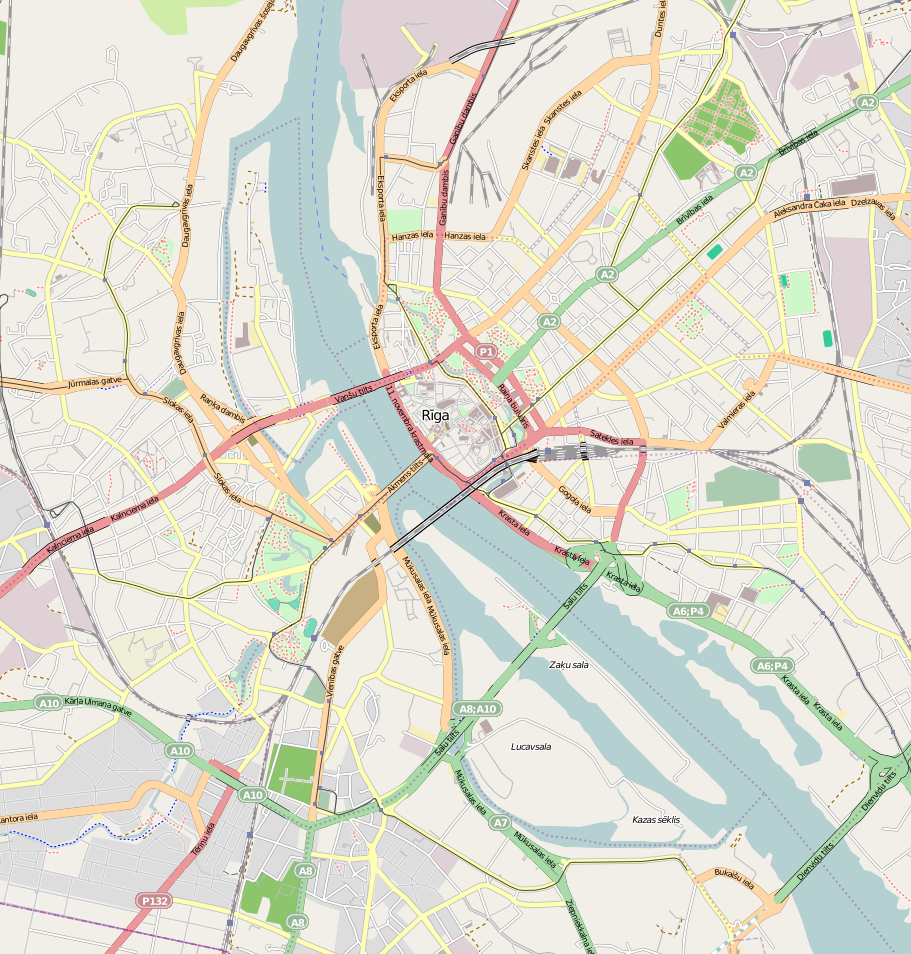
- Location within Riga
- 56°56′51.09″N 24°6′38.90″E
- Location: Riga
- Country: Latvia
- Denomination: Lutheran
- Previous denomination: Roman Catholicism

St. John's Church (Latvian: Svētā Jāņa Evaņģēliski luteriskā baznīca) is a Lutheran church in Riga, the capital of Latvia. It is a parish church of the Evangelical Lutheran Church of Latvia. The church is situated at the address 24 Skārņu Street.

== Dedication ==
The church is dedicated to St John the Baptist and contains several art works related to the saint, including a large painting on the north side of the crossing, and a stained glass window depicting the saint, to the right (south) of the high altar. The window, with others, was installed around 1900.

== History ==
The church is built on the site of the bishop's palace of Albert of Riga (thirteenth century). In 1234 Dominican friars took responsibility for the original small chapel and dedicated it to John the Baptist. It was extended around 1330, and continued as a Dominican chapel and parish church until 1523, and the Reformation. It continued as a parish church of the reformed Evangelical Lutheran Church. From 1587 there was further expansion of the church, in stages.

The church suffered severe damage in Riga's great city fire of 31 May 1677, but was repaired, with a new spire added.

== Architecture ==
Architect of the interior and exterior of the church from 1586 to 1589 was Joris Jorissen Frese. Frese likely drew inspiration for the use of rustication and mosaic friezes on church façades from Hans Vredeman de Vries’s Architectura, published in Antwerp in 1577. This architectural treatise presented various compositions of classical orders, particularly the Tuscan order. Variations of the Tuscan order are evident in the façade compositions of both the Holy Trinity Church in Jelgava and St John’s Church in Riga.

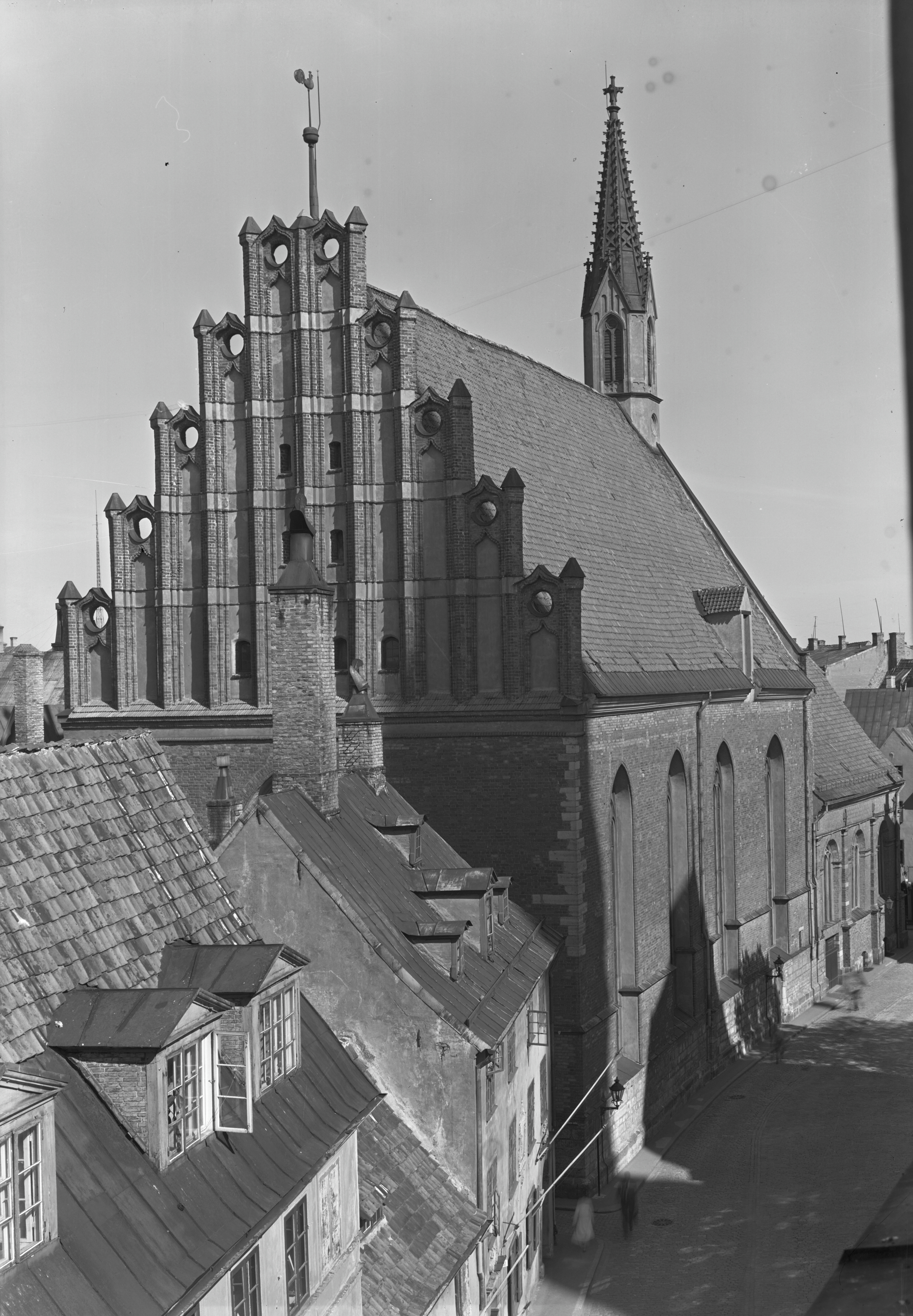
View from the northwest (c. 1940)

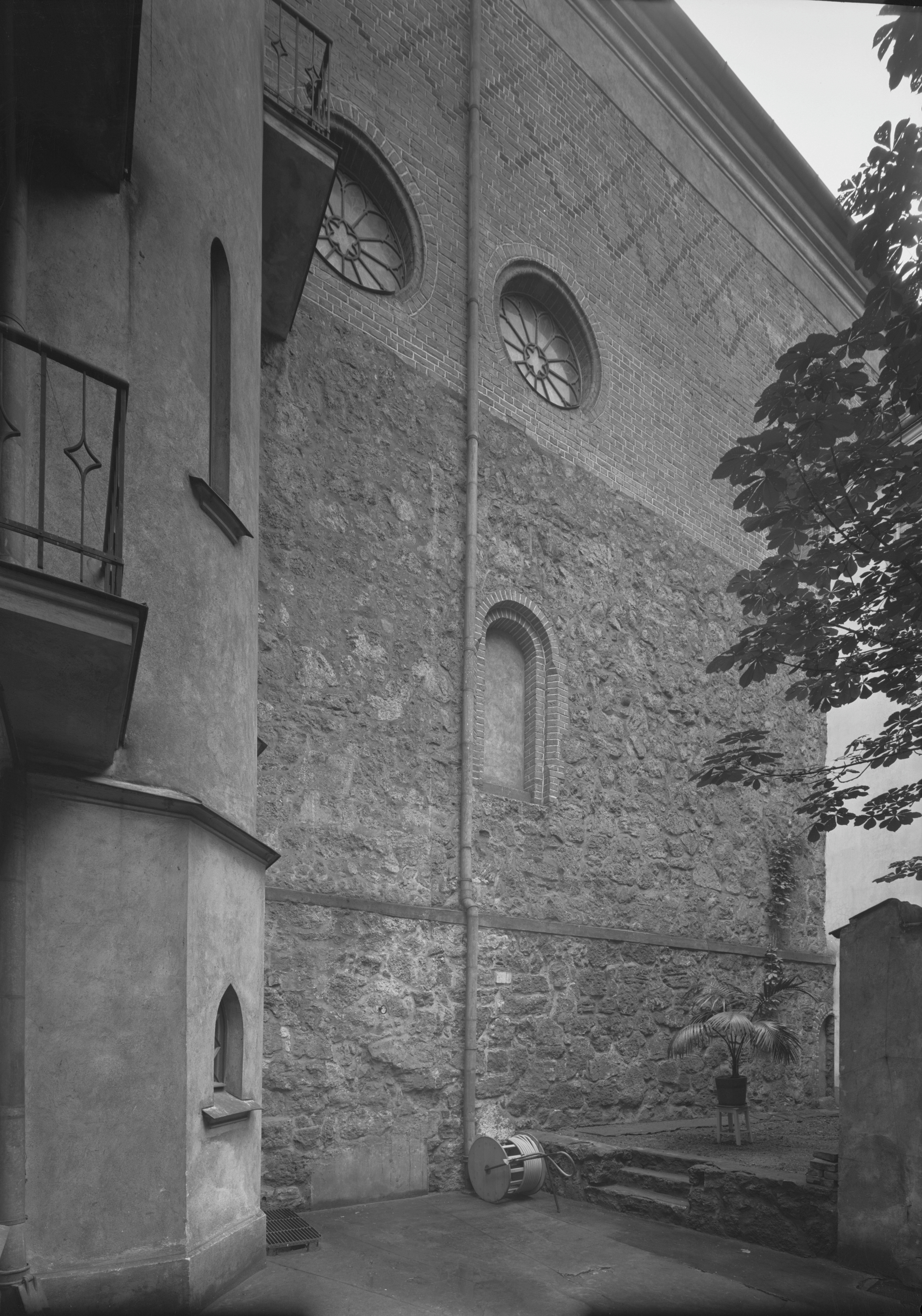
Partial view of the north facade from the northeast

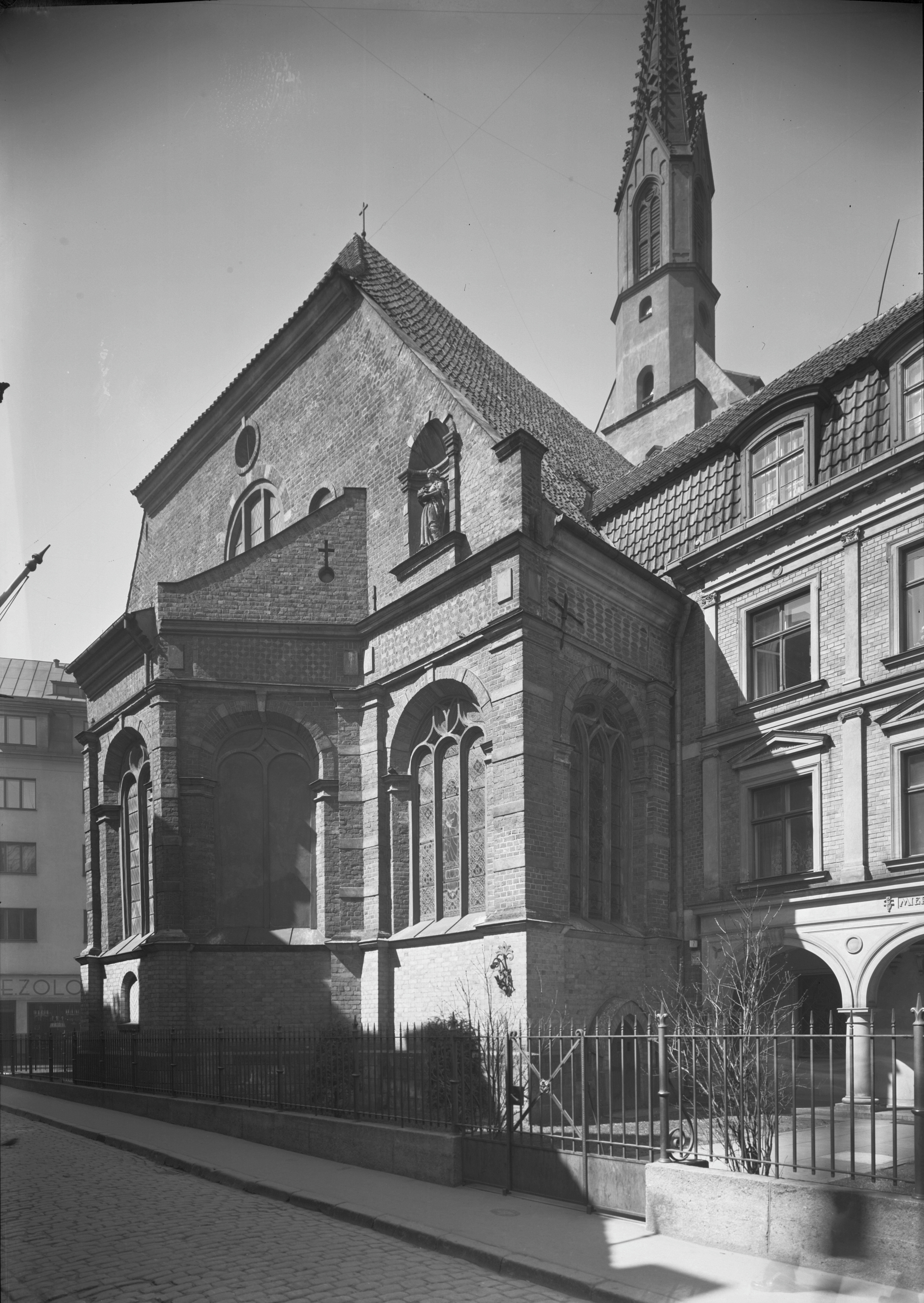
Choir extension from the east

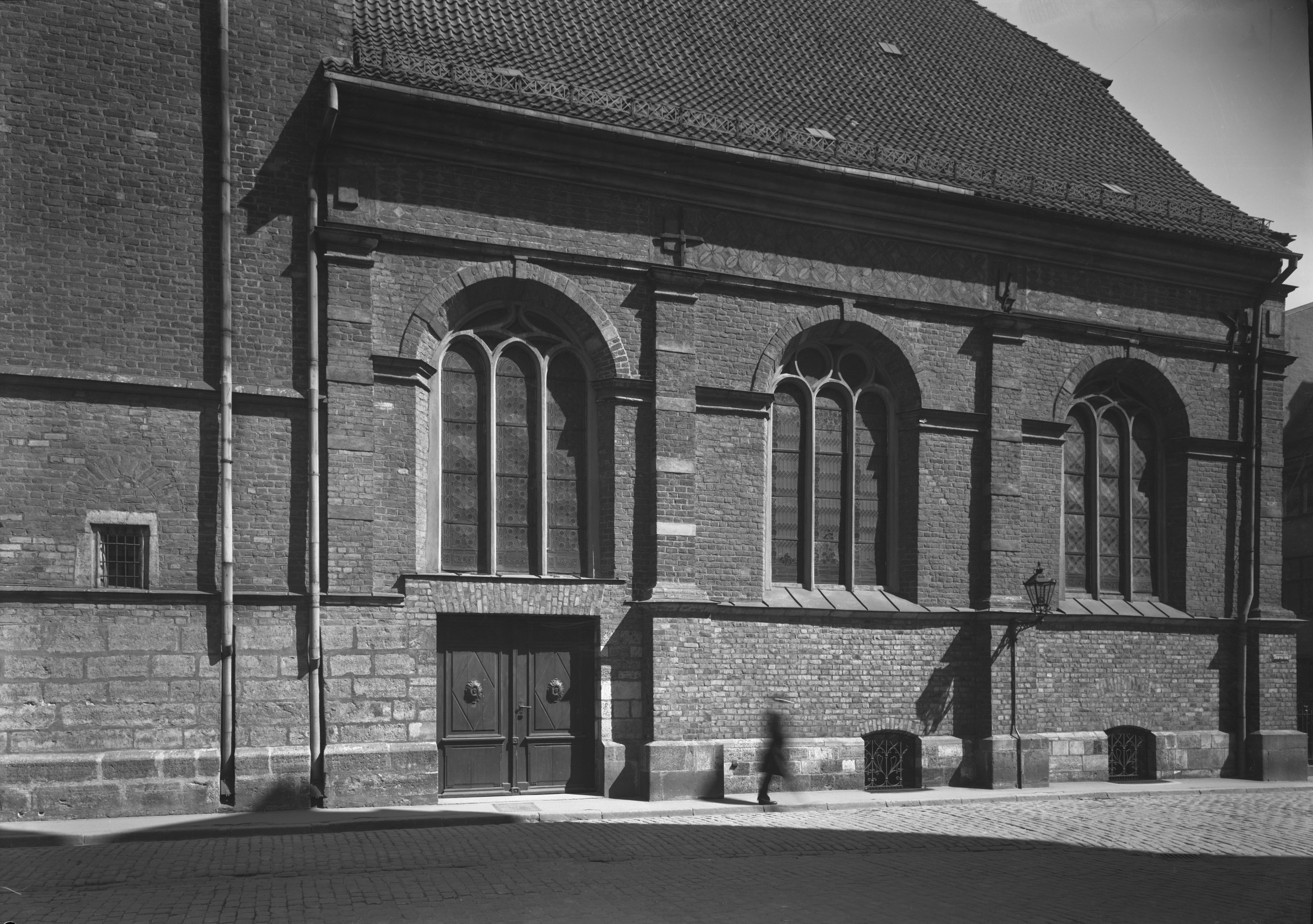
Choir extension from the west

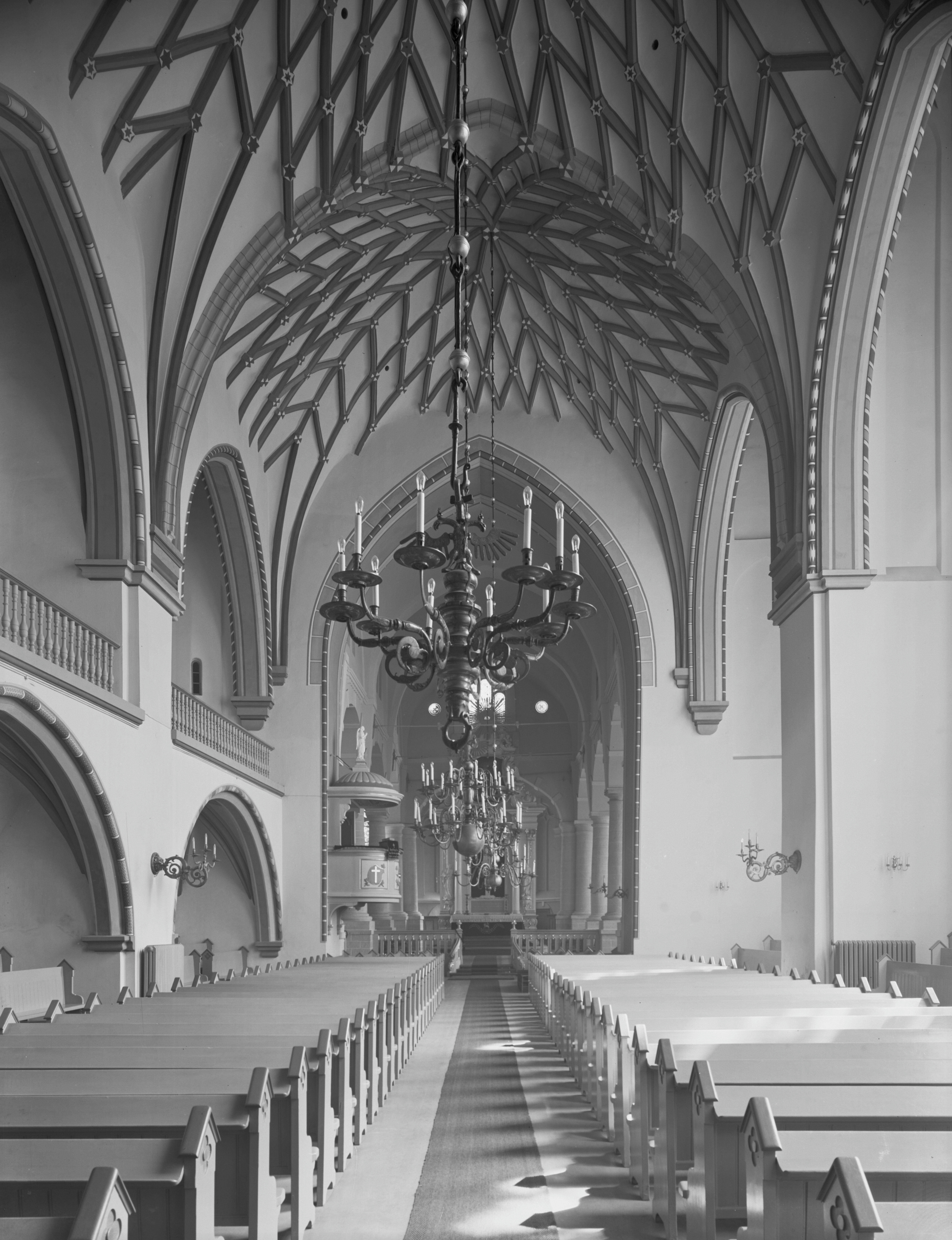
View through the single-nave nave to the choir to the southeast

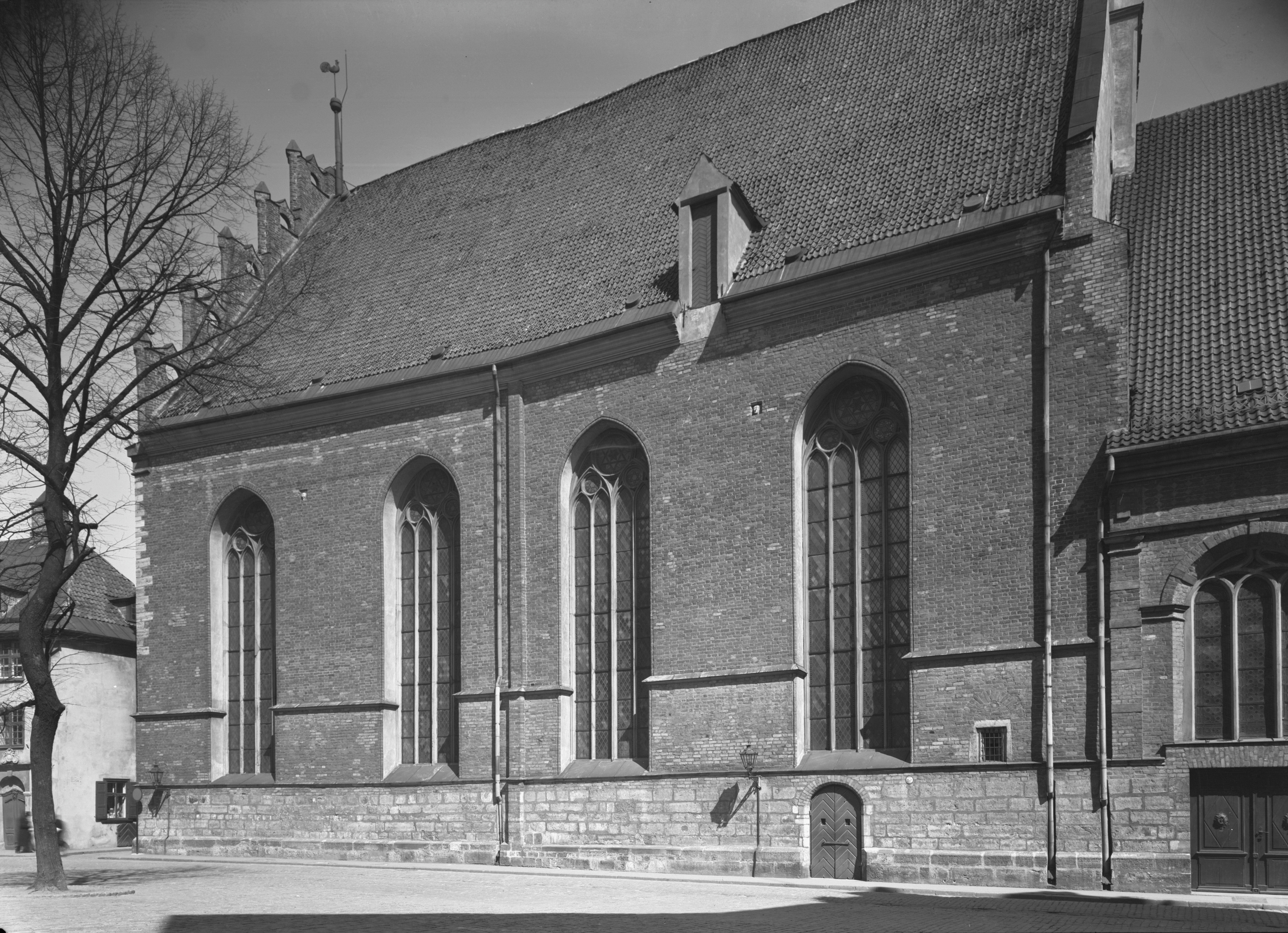
Southwest facade of the nave from south-southwest

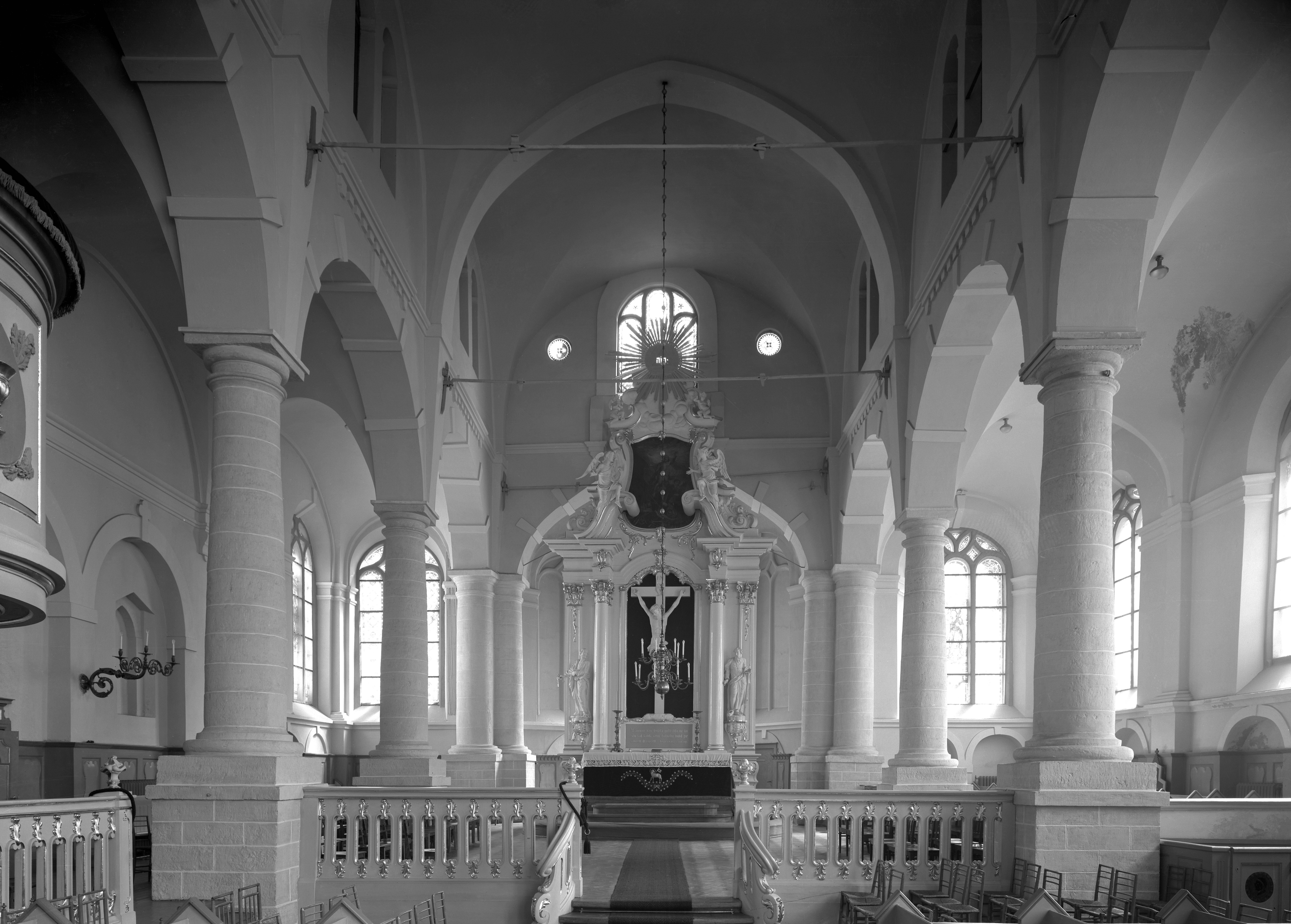
View into the three-aisled choir to the southeast

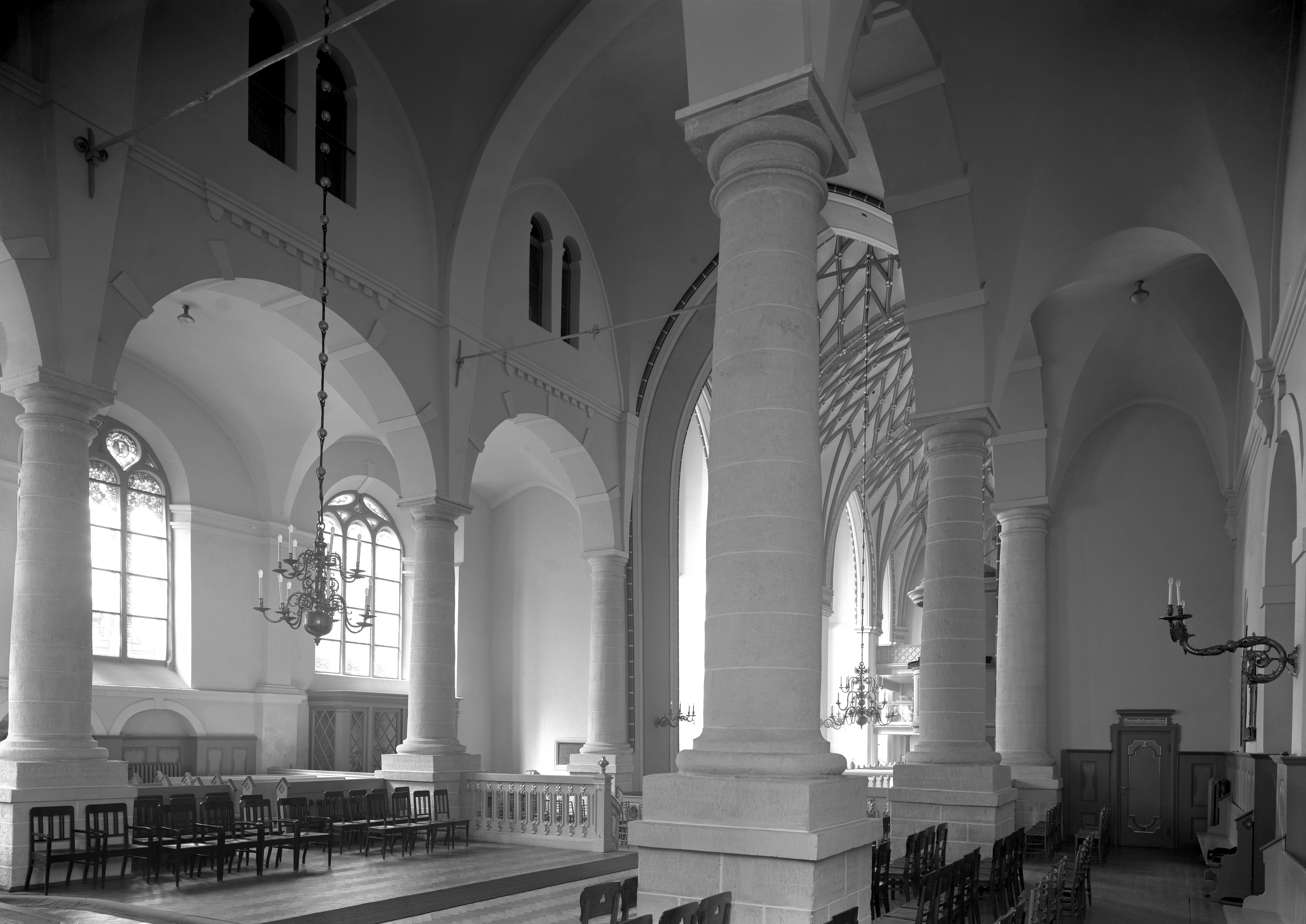
View through the three-aisled choir to the west

== Current use ==
The church is an active place of worship, with more than a thousand registered members, and public worship every Sunday morning and Wednesday evening. It is also a popular tourist venue, and is regularly open to visitors when guides are available. The church is also used as a concert venue, due to its large size and good acoustic properties.

== Gallery ==
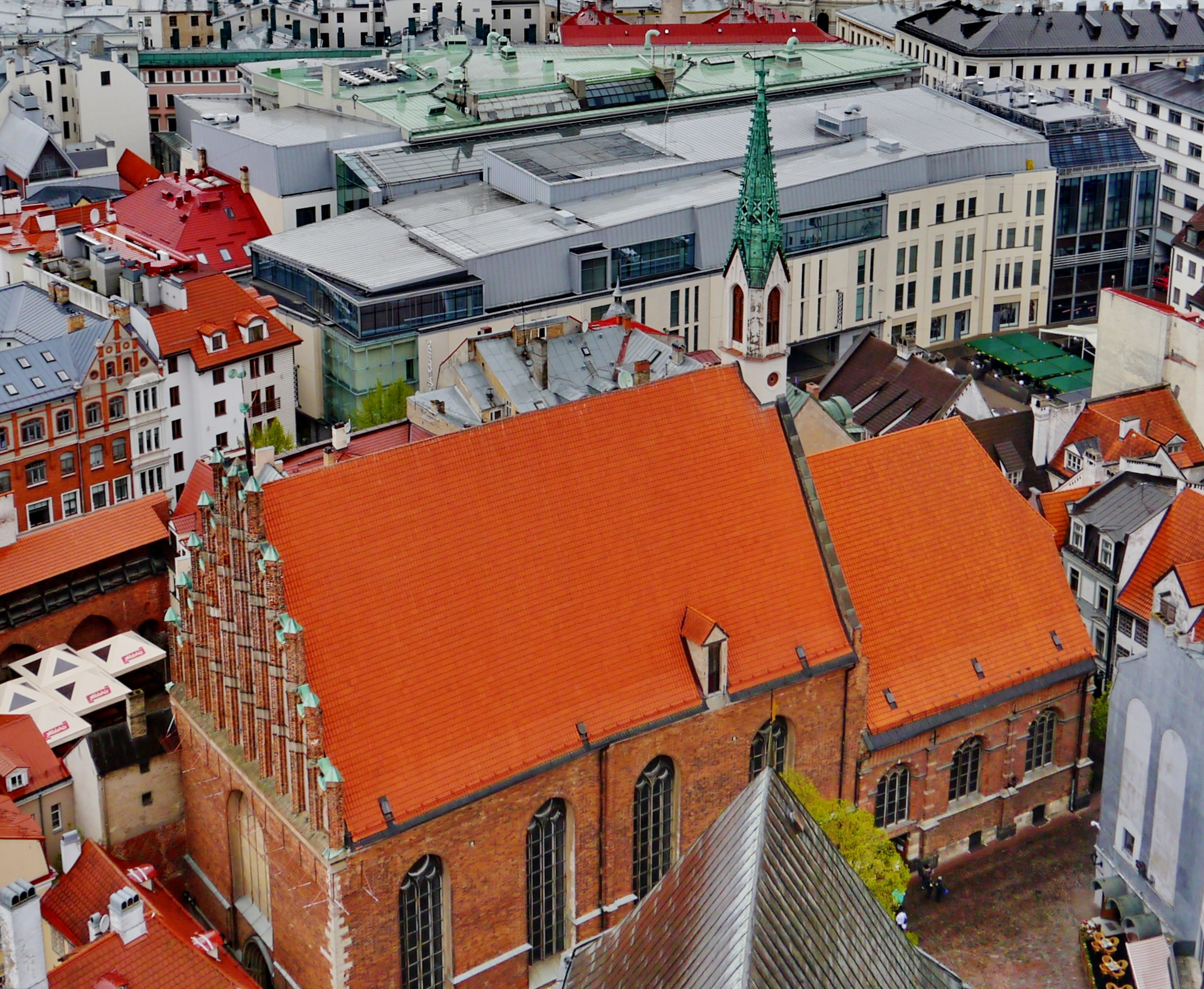
View from St. Peter's Church

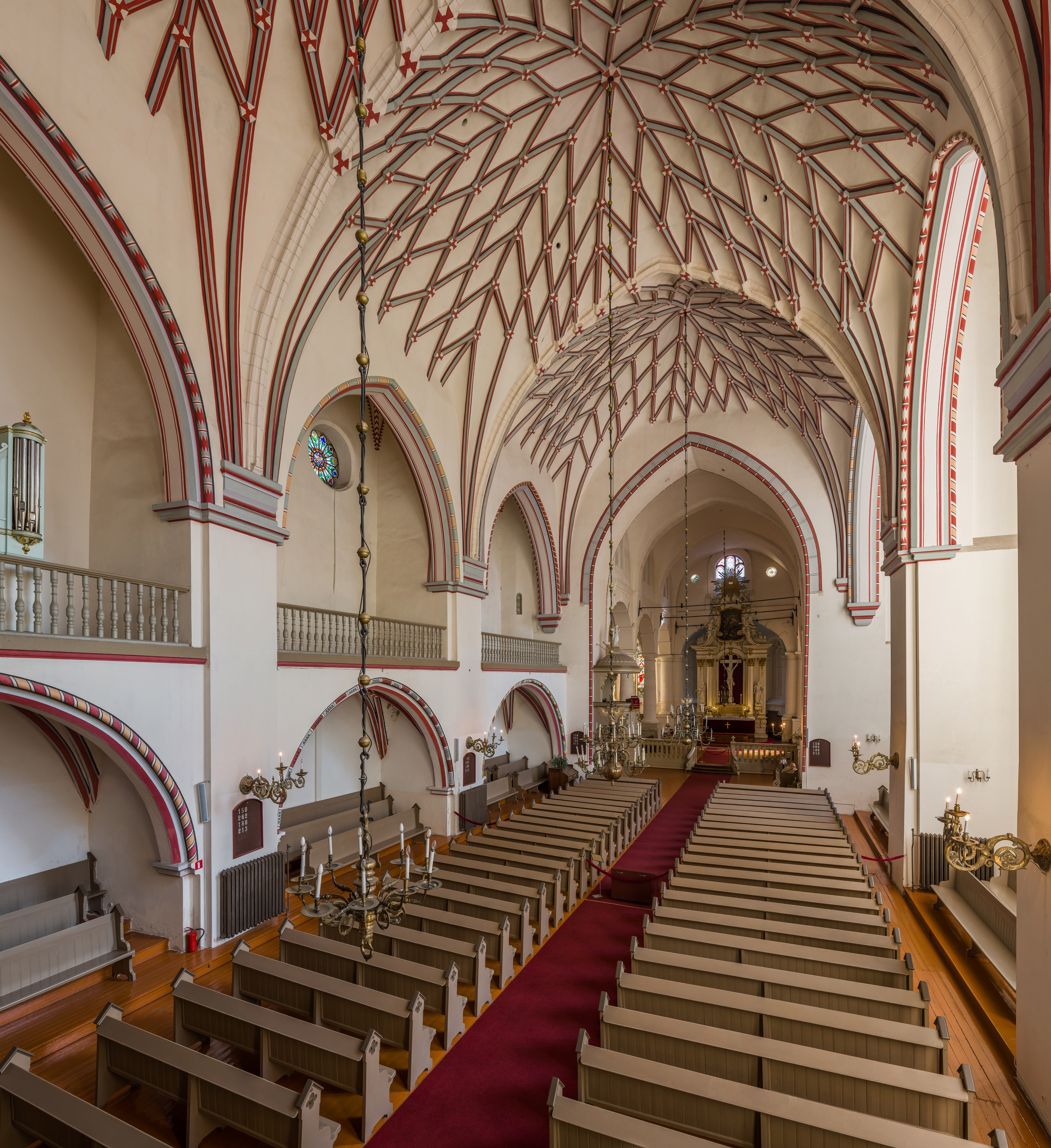
The interior looking toward the high altar

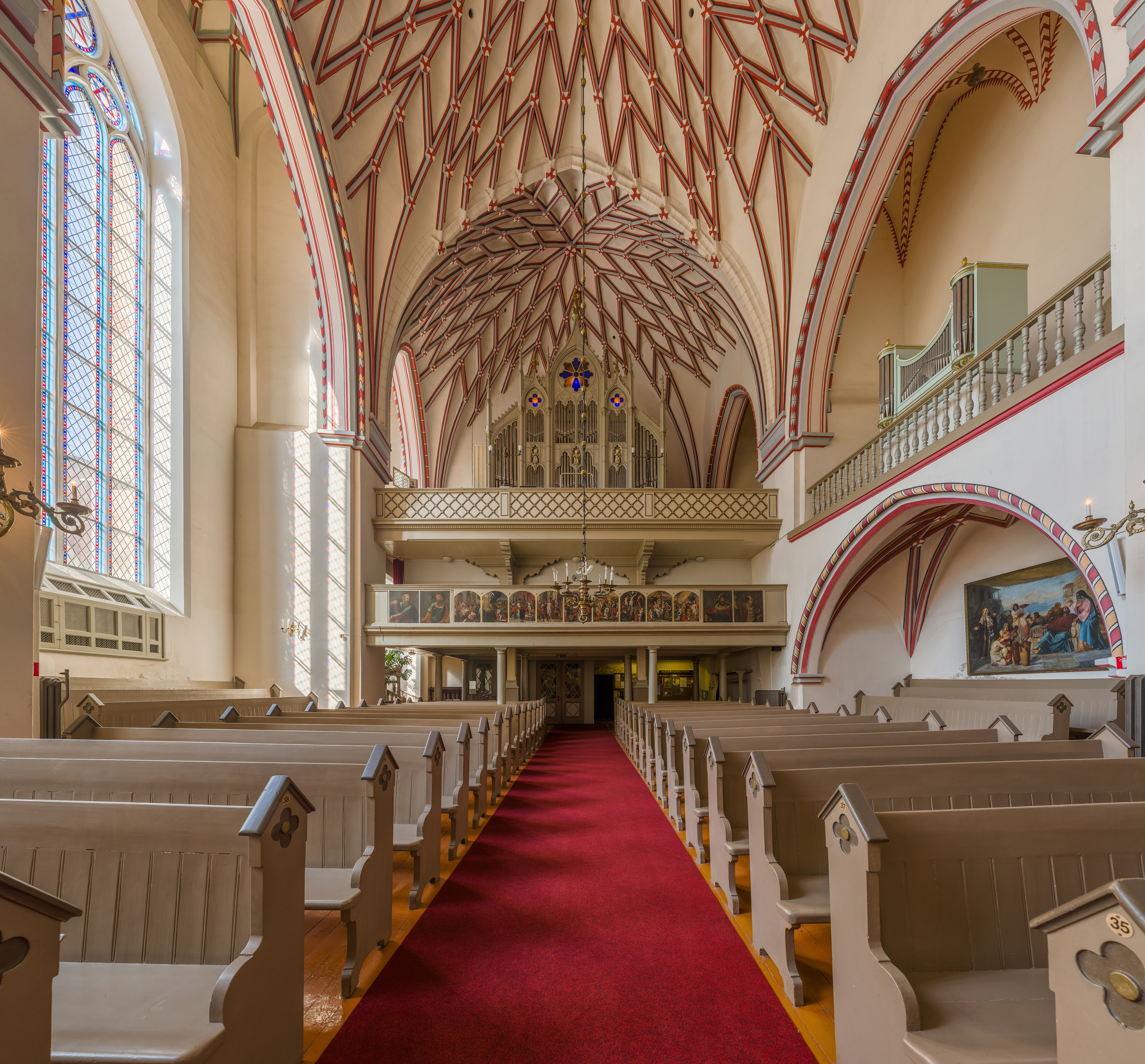
Looking north west toward the organ

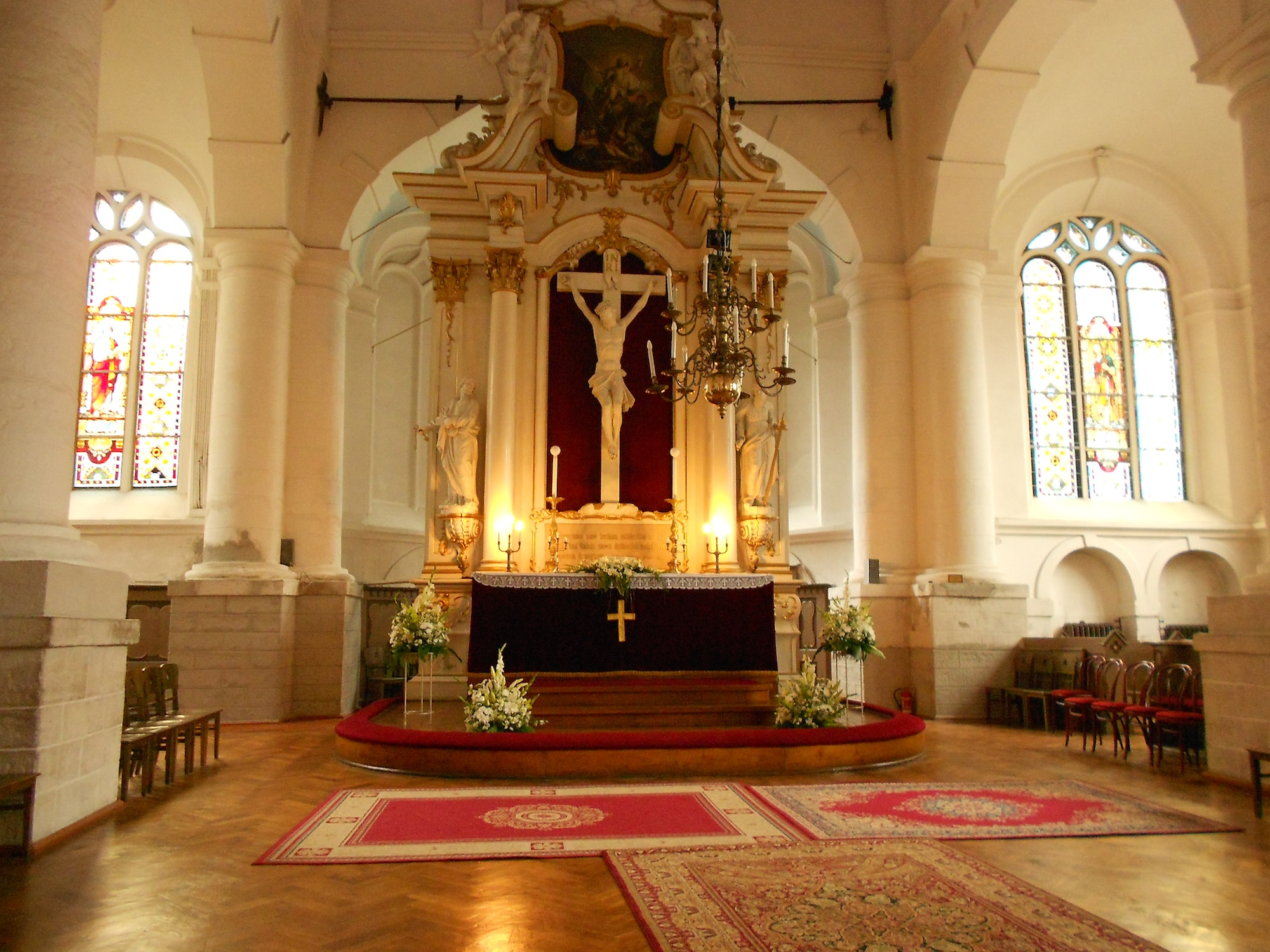
The high altar and chancel area
