= Great Stockholm Fire of 1625 =

Major city fire in Sweden

The Great Stockholm Fire of 1625 was among the first known large scale fires in Stockholm prior to the city plan changes of the 17th-century. The fire began in the evening of 1 September 1625 in Kåkbrinken, and devastated the southwestern parts of Stadsholmen. It lasted three days and reportedly destroyed a fifth of the infrastructure of Stockholm at the time. The fire resulted in the building of a new city over the burnt areas, and a new tightened organisation of inspection of the fire prevention measures in the city.

== Sources ==
- Linnea Forsberg (2001). ”Stora branden 1625”. Stormaktstidens Stockholm tar gestalt: gaturegleringen i Stockholm 1625-1650. Monografier utgivna av Stockholms stad, 0282-5899; 157. Stockholm: Stockholmia förlag. Libris 8369526. ISBN 91-7031-117-X
