= Udo Frese =

- Born: 1972 (age 53–54); Germany
- Education: University of Paderborn; Friedrich-Alexander-Universität Erlangen-Nürnberg
- Scientific career
- Fields: Robotics
- Workplaces: DFKI Bremen; University of Bremen
- Doctoral advisor: Gerd Hirzinger

Udo Frese is assistant professor at the University of Bremen and leads the group for real time computer vision. He is also affiliated with the German Research Centre for Artificial Intelligence in Bremen.

He received his Ph.D. degree from the University of Erlangen–Nuremberg where he studied different aspects of the simultaneous localization and mapping (SLAM) problem. He developed two successful mapping system: TreeMap and Multi-Level Relaxation (MLR). Additionally, he is working in the field of safety algorithms for robots including areas such as collision avoidance.

Together with Cyrill Stachniss and Giorgio Grisetti he is a co-founder of the open source SLAM repository called OpenSLAM.org.
