= Daniel Hermann (humanist) =

Diplomat and Renaissance humanist

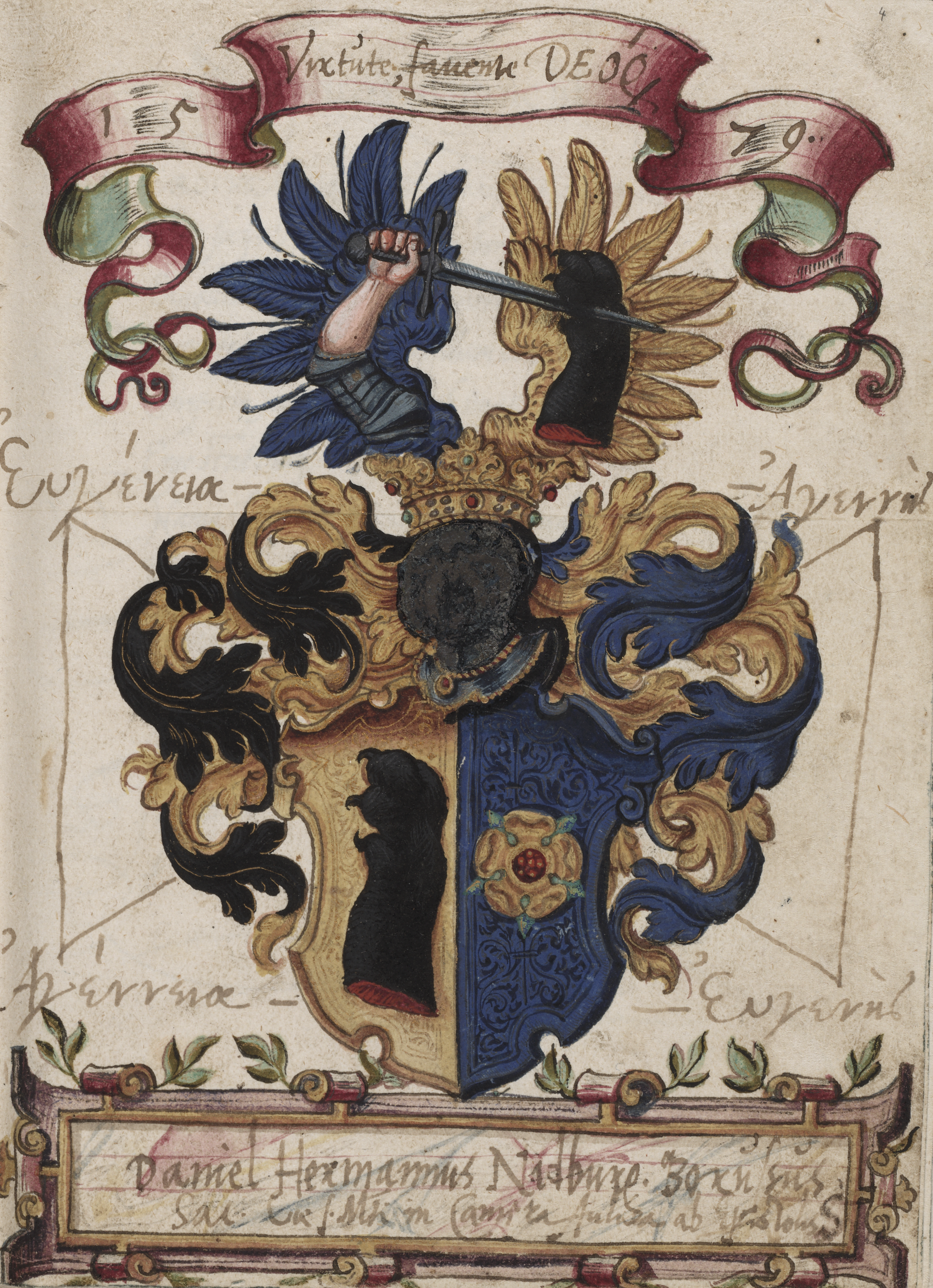
- The coat of arms of Hermann, as found in his album amicorum
- Born: c. 1543; Nidzica (Niedenburg), Duchy of Prussia, Crown of the Kingdom of Poland
- Died: 1601 (aged 57–58); Riga, Duchy of Livonia, Polish–Lithuanian Commonwealth
- Occupations: Renaissance humanist Diplomat

Daniel Hermann (c. 1543–1601) was a diplomat and Renaissance humanist. He was born in the town of Nidzica, where his father was the mayor. He studied at several universities, but he never earned a formal degree. From 1572 or 1573 he worked as a diplomat in the service first of the Imperial Court and then later for the city of Gdańsk. While serving as an ambassador to King Stephen Báthory of Poland and Grand Duke of Lithuania, Hermann embarked to the city of Riga, where he married and settled down. He was a productive Neo-Latin poet. His collected works, comprising in total three volumes of didactic and occasional poetry, were published by his widow after his death.

== Biography ==
=== Early life and studies ===
Daniel Hermann was born in the town of Nidzica (then called Nibork/Neidenburg) in what was then the Duchy of Prussia within the Crown of the Kingdom of Poland. The date of his birth is disputed, but is given as 1543 in most sources. Daniel Hermann had three brothers and two sisters. His father was the mayor of the town; the family was well-off. It was also a Lutheran family, and Daniel's father had actively worked for introducing the Reformation to the town. Daniel Hermann appears to have identified as a Prussian and throughout his life he wrote appreciatively of his native land in his poetry. In 1557 he was enrolled in the University of Königsberg, and he would spend the next years pursuing studies in several different cities: apart from Königsberg also in Strasbourg (with Johannes Sturm as his teacher), Basel, Wittenberg, and possibly also Ingolstadt. His studies focused on languages, law and philosophy, but Hermann also showed an interest in natural sciences, especially geology. His itinerant studies was at least partially supported by a grand from Duke Albrecht of Prussia. He apparently never acquired a formal degree.

=== Diplomatic service ===
Daniel Hermann moved to Vienna in 1572 or 1573, where he found employment at the Imperial Court. He stayed at the Imperial Court, including a stint in Prague, until 1579, when he received and accepted an offer of employment from the city of Gdańsk. In Gdańsk he was entrusted with the diplomatic negotiations with the King of Poland, Stephen Báthory. Báthory had recently besieged Gdańsk and forced the city to pay a tribute and accept the king as their overlord, and Hermann was entrusted with negotiating the implementation of the settlement. He thus became a permanent ambassador at the royal court, which at the time was itinerant. In this capacity he participated in the Livonian campaign of Stephen Báthory against Ivan the Terrible. He was present at the peace negotiations in Vilnius during the winter of 1581–1582. In spring 1582 he went ahead of Báthory's army to Riga.

=== Life in Riga ===
In Riga, Hermann found lodging in the house of a young widow, Ursula Krüger. He fell in love with her and already in April 1582 wrote to the city council of Gdańsk informing them that he intended to stay in Riga. The couple married the same year. Hermann is known to have been favourable to the education of women, and his wife came to be actively engaged in his intellectual work. Philologist Kristi Viiding describes the marriage as "an ideal marriage of humanistically educated partners" and notes that following the death of Daniel Hermann his wife edited, published, and wrote the prefaces to the volumes of his collected poems.

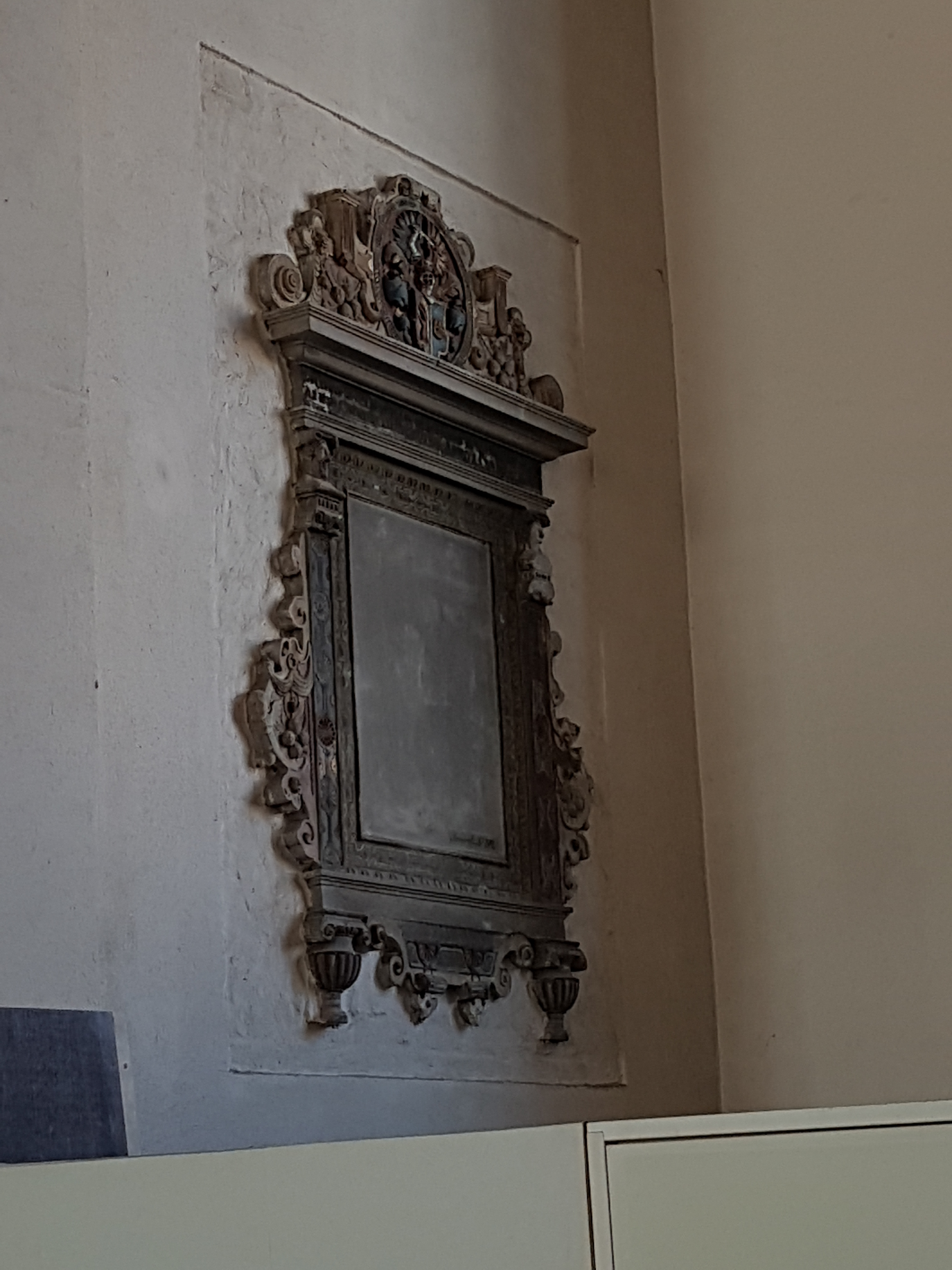
Funerary memorial to Daniel Hermann in Riga Cathedral

After settling in Riga, Hermann first took employment as councillor and German secretary to Cardinal Jerzy Radziwiłł. After the death of Radziwiłł, he was employed by General Jürgen von Farensbach until his death. Hermann then decided to retire from public service and devote himself to poetry for the short remainder of his life. Daniel Hermann died towards the end of 1601 in Riga.

== Works ==
Apart from his engagement in diplomacy and politics, Hermann was a productive poet, writing in Modern Latin and participating actively in the intellectual life of Riga. Much of what he wrote was occasional poetry, composed for example to celebrate the wedding of friends and colleagues, or to commemorate their death, but also to mark important events in the lives of princes and kings. He also published poems on the occasions of the foundations of the University of Strasbourg (where he had studied) and the Zamoyski Academy. He also composed didactic poems, intended to offer instruction or insight in fields such as theology, philosophy, natural science or politics. Within this genre he composed poems on very diverse subjects, for example on the inclusion of a lizard and a frog in a piece of amber, the eagle in the coat of arms of Poland, and a child suffering from Fraser syndrome. The latter poem is one of the earliest depictions known of this disorder, and written clearly enough for modern readers to be able to distinguish the different malformations using modern medical terms. By the time of his death, he had collected his poems in three volumes which were published posthumously by his widow and printed by Nikolaus Mollyn. Hermann also possessed a personal library containing several important early editions of classical authors, though much of it was lost during World War II.

== Sources ==
- Frisch, Magnus (2015). "Daniel Hermann – a Well-Travelled Prussian Humanist and His Poetic Work in Riga" (PDF). Letonica (30): 44–58. ISSN 1407-3110.
- Kreigere-Liepiņa, Laura (2016). "Amber in the Poem "De Rana et Lacerta, Succino Prussiaco Insitis" (About a Frog and a Lizard Embedded in Prussian Amber) by Daniel Hermann (1543—1601), a Humanist from Riga". Amber in the History of Medicine: Proceedings of the International Conference: 234–244. ISBN 978-5-903920-43-3.
- Lībiete, Ieva (2019). "The monster of Ascheraden: A description of syndromic cryptophthalmos by poet Daniel Hermann in "De monstroso partu…" published in Riga, 1596". Birth Defects Research. 112 (3): 278–282. doi:10.1002/bdr2.1632. PMID 31833234.
- Taimiņa, Aija (2016). "The book collection of Daniel Hermann, poet, diplomat and civil servant, as a source for biography and cultural studies". Amber in the History of Medicine: Proceedings of the International Conference: 245–265.
- Viiding, Kristi (2017). "The first woman in the process of book production in Livonia: the case of Ursula Krüger and Daniel Hermann". Journal of Baltic Studies. 48 (3): 351–362. doi:10.1080/01629778.2016.1141106.
