= Nikolaus Mollyn =

Rigan book printer (1550–1625)

- Born: c. 1550/1555; Antwerp, Spanish Netherlands (today Belgium)
- Died: 1625
- Occupation: Book printer

Nikolaus Mollyn (Dutch: Niclaes Mollijns, Latvian: Nikolajs Mollīns, c. 1550/1555 – 1625) (Note: During Mollyn's lifetime, there was no standardised way of spelling his name, and in different sources his name have been written in different ways; in addition, the rendering of his name in Latvian also shows considerable variety. Hence, known forms of his surname are Mollinus, Mollynus, Mollin and Mollyn, and versions of his first name include Niclaes and Niclaas, with Nikolauss, Nikolajs, Niklass, Nikolavs and Niklavs being known forms of his first name in Latvian.) was a book printer, the first to establish a printing press in Riga. Born in Antwerp, he left his home region, probably due to increasing religious unrest in the area, and settled in Riga in 1588. From 1591 he was formally employed by the city council as the city printer, and from 1597 the city council also paid for his lodgings.

Only 179 works printed by Mollyn have been preserved; many were lost to bombs during World War II. The range of his printing activity was wide, spanning from works on theology and school books to literature and works on history. In 1615 he was the first to print a Latvian-language book within the present-day territory of Latvia.

== Biography ==
Nikolaus Mollyn was very probably of Flemish origin. His father is probably identical with one Jan Mollijns, a book printer active in Antwerp around 1532. He was a Protestant, and was expelled from the city for some time for printing books the Catholic church disliked. Upon his death, his son Nikolaus took over his printing business. It is possible that he or his family at some point had collaborated with Christophe Plantin. A Protestant like his father, Nikolaus Mollyn however left Antwerp in connection with the growing religious unrest in the area and initially settled in Amsterdam around 1586–1587. The following year his name appears for the first time in Riga, where he remained for the rest of his life. He thus became the first book printer to operate in Riga. Before the arrival of Mollyn, books for use in Riga had been printed in German, Dutch and Polish cities.

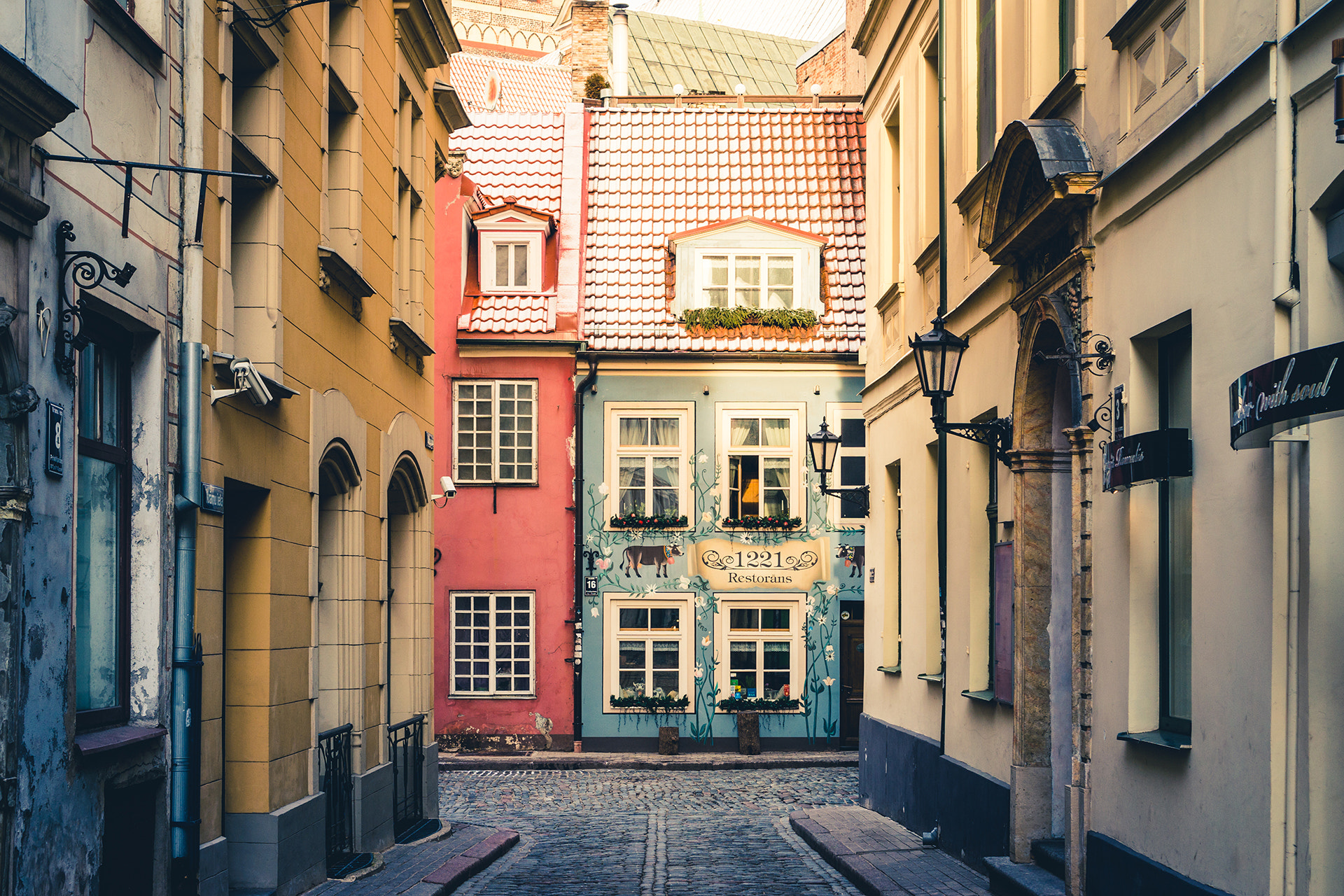
Krāmu iela in Riga, the street where Mollyn had his house and printing press

Mollyn had been invited to Riga by David Hilchen, who was syndic or legal advisor to the city council, and a writer and Renaissance humanist. Mollyn's house (since vanished) and workshop was located on present-day Krāmu iela (Kramu Street). The first two years in Riga, Hilchen personally paid for Mollyn's expenses, but from 1591 he was formally employed by the city council as the city printer. This meant that he was obliged to prioritise printing material for the city council, the church and the city schools, and was prohibited from printing material objectionable to the council or the church. He received an annual salary, and from 1597 also free housing paid by the city council. In the same year his daughter married, and together with his son-in-law he also branched out into operating a proper book shop, with the approval of the council. Mollyn soon enjoyed an almost complete monopoly on book trade in the city.

Nonetheless, the first years of the 17th century was a difficult time for Mollyn. Religious and political unrest and the arrival of the plague in 1603 had a negative impact on business. The city was besieged in 1601 during the Polish-Swedish War, and Swedish war ships restricted the access of vital supplies like paper and books for Mollyn. After the city had been conquered by the Swedes in 1621, things improved for the book trade. His privilege as city printer was reaffirmed by the new Swedish authorities, and reproductions of his works by other printers forbidden throughout Swedish territory. As the Swedes also opened new schools in Riga and Tallinn, and later a university in Tartu, his business opportunities in the greater region also expanded. Mollyn could enjoy the fruits of these improvements only briefly however, as he died sometime before the summer of 1625, probably in connection with another outbreak of the plague. The business was continued by his son-in-law, but he also died within a year. The presses were then sold to one Gerhardt Schröder, who became the new city printer until 1657.

== Works ==
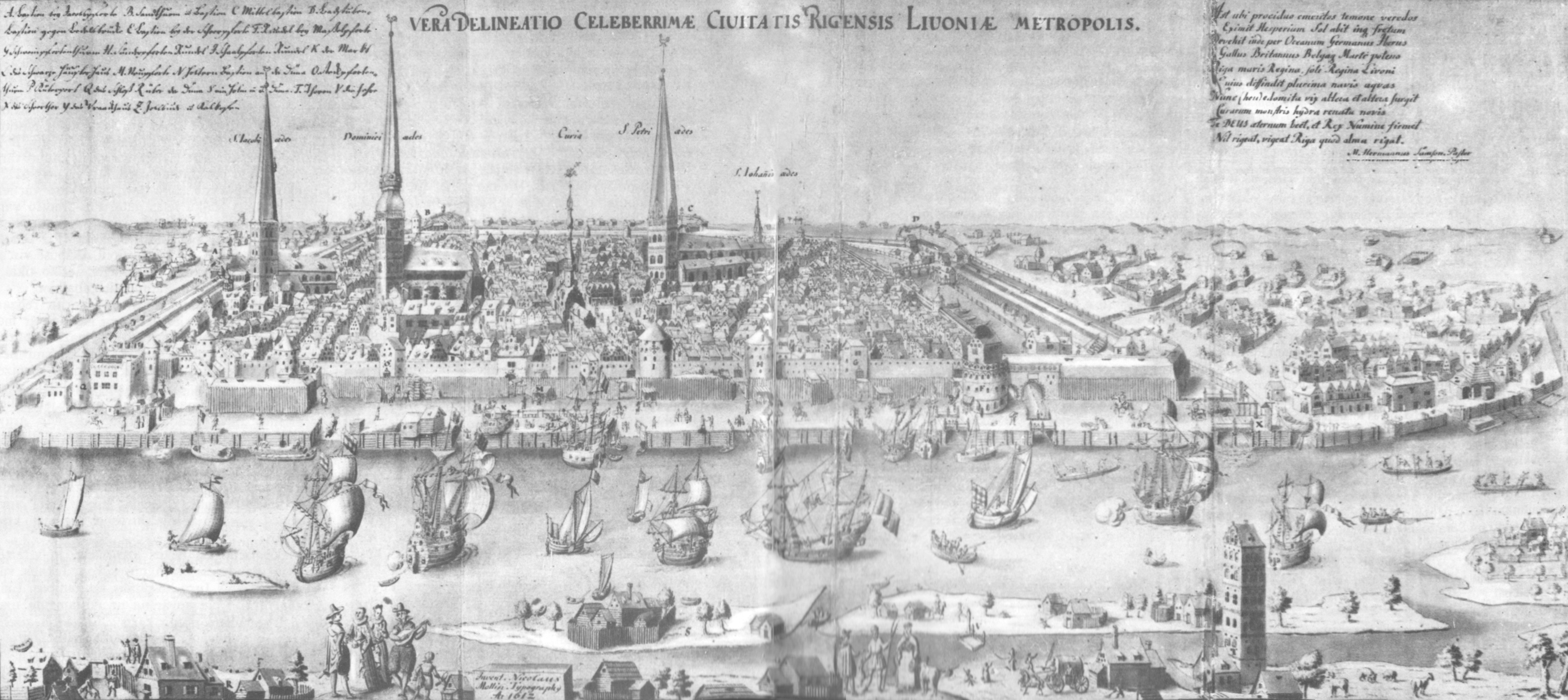
View of Riga 1612, printed by Mollyn, engraved by Heinrich Thum

Only 179 works printed in the presses of Mollyn are known to have been preserved. Many were lost during World War I and particularly World War II, when the city library of Riga, the House of the Blackheads and the provincial museum in Jelgava, that held several works by Mollyn, were all bombed. Most of the preserved works printed by Mollyn are located in the National Library of Latvia and the Academic Library of the University of Latvia. Smaller amounts are also found in collections in Saint Petersburg, Tallinn, Tartu and Helsinki.

Of the 179 works printed by Mollyn, 126 were in Latin, 48 in German, three in Latvian and one each in Swedish and Finnish. In 1615 he was the first to print a Latvian-language book in the present-day territory of Latvia. (The first book in Latvian to be printed at all was printed by Georg Osterberger in Königsberg in 1553.) The range of topics was wide: theology and books for the church, textbooks for the city schools, publications from the city council, but also literary works such as Latin classics and humanistic literature, for example poems by Daniel Hermann. An amount of scientific books and history also left his presses, as well as a detailed copper engraving view of Riga dated 1612.
