= Nidzica =

Town in Warmian-Masurian Voivodeship, Poland

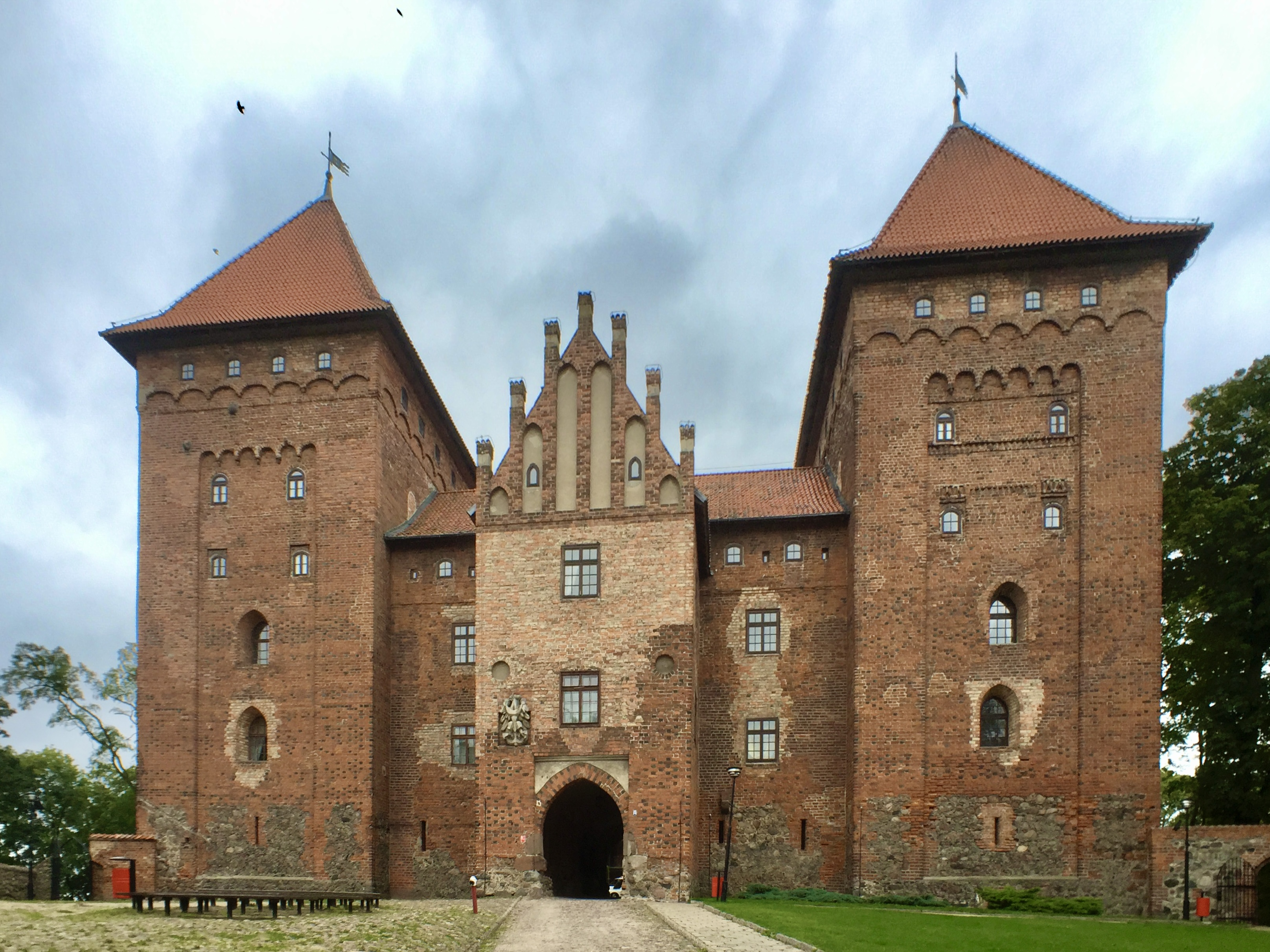
- Nidzica Castle

- Coat of arms

- Location within Poland
- Coordinates: 53°21′30″N 20°25′30″E
- Country: Poland
- Voivodeship: Warmian-Masurian
- County: Nidzica
- Gmina: Nidzica
- Town rights: 1381

Government
  - Mayor: Jacek Kosmala

Area
  - Total: 6.86 km^{2} (2.65 sq mi)

Population (2017)
  - Total: 13,872
  - Density: 2,020/km^{2} (5,240/sq mi)
- Time zone: UTC+1 (CET)
  - Summer (DST): UTC+2 (CEST)
- Postal code: 13-100
- Area code: +48 89
- Car plates: NNI
- Website: http://www.nidzica.pl/

Nidzica (Polish: [ɲiˈd͡ʑit͡sa]; formerly Nibork; German: Neidenburg [ˈnaɪdn̩bʊʁk]; Prussian: Nīdaspils) is a town in the Warmian-Masurian Voivodeship in north-central Poland, lying between Olsztyn and Mława, in Masuria. The capital of Nidzica County, its population in 2017 was 13,872.

Nidzica is a member of Cittaslow.

== History ==
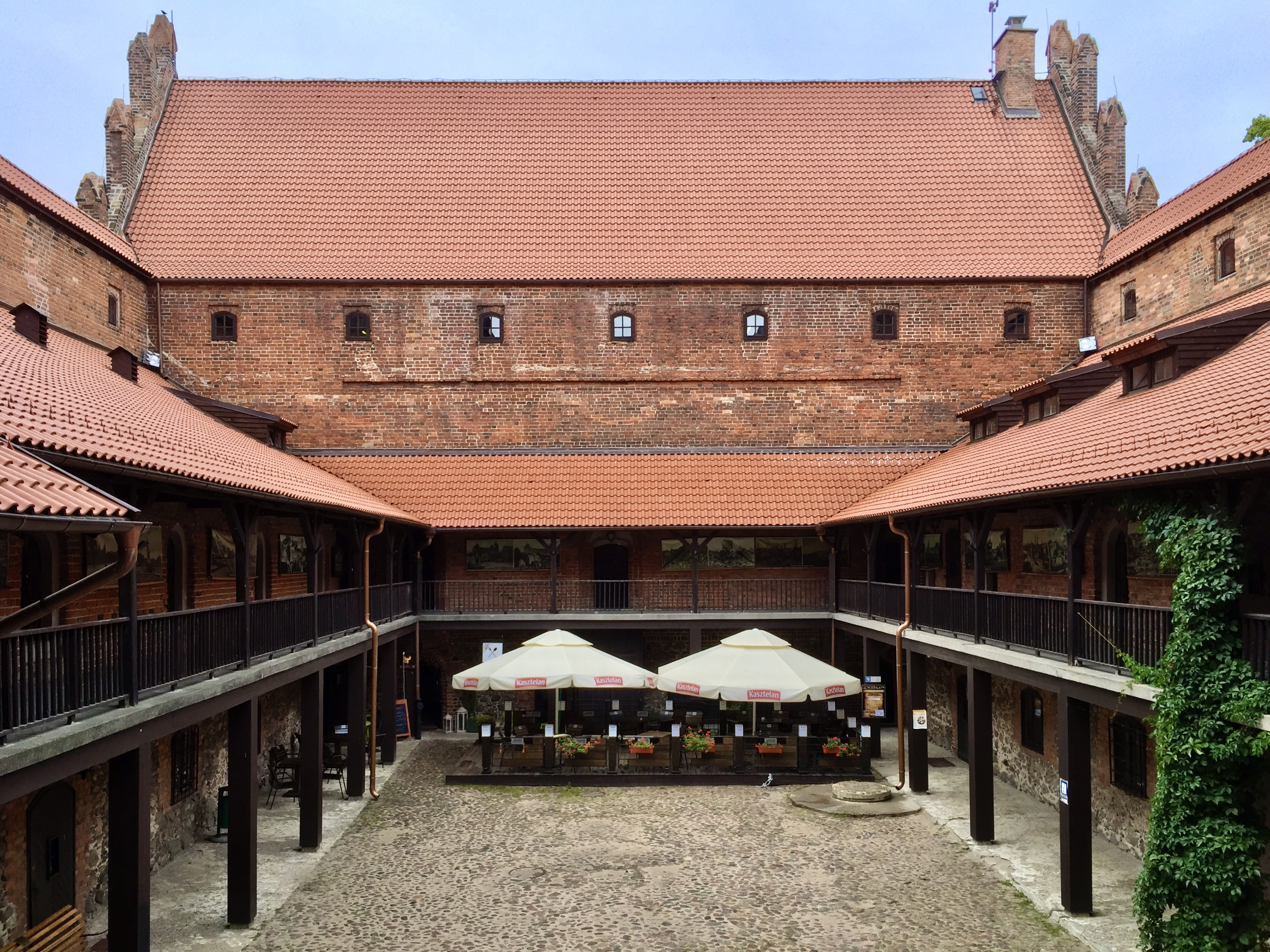
Nidzica Castle courtyard

The settlement was originally founded by Old Prussians who established a small fortified fort and were subsequently invaded by Teutonic Knights in 1355, who then erected a small castle around 1376 and implemented Chełmno town law in the settlement after 1381. After the victorious Battle of Grunwald (1410) the town remained in Polish hands for three months. It was again captured by the Poles in 1414.

From 1444 Neidenburg was a member of the Prussian Confederation, at which request in 1454 Polish King Casimir IV Jagiellon signed the act of incorporation of the region to the Kingdom of Poland. The Polish army then peacefully entered the town and Adam Wilkanowski became the commander in the castle. In 1455 a Teutonic attack was repulsed and the town remained within Poland for the rest of the war. The incorporation of Nidzica to Poland was confirmed in the peace treaty signed in Toruń in 1466, but two years later the town came under Teutonic rule, remaining under Polish suzerainty as a fief. It then became part of the Duchy of Prussia, also a vassal state of Poland, after the secularization of the Order's Prussian territories in 1525. After 1525, Nibork was capital of the county, whose first administrator was Piotr Kobierzycki, a local Polish nobleman. In 1549 the Czech Brethren settled in the town. In the 16th, 17th and 18th centuries, Polish pastors from Nibork published their works and translations in both Nibork and Königsberg (Królewiec). In 1656 the town was unsuccessfully besieged during the Northern Wars. The city suffered from fires in 1656, 1664, 1784 and 1804. In 16th century a significant part of inhabitants in surrounding countryside were Polish farmers.

Neidenburg became part of the Kingdom of Prussia in 1701. Half of Neidenburg's inhabitants died from plague from 1708 to 1711. In 1758 the town was under Russian control. In the 18th century, a Polish school was one of the leading language schools teaching Polish in the region. Even youth from as far as Danzig (Gdańsk), Elbląg and Königsberg studied here. During the Napoleonic Wars, French and Polish troops led by general Józef Zajączek were stationed in the town. In 1831 a cholera epidemic broke out, which killed 218 people. In 1832 Polish soldiers from failed uprising against Russia were interned in the city Since 1840 the local German authorities issued decrees ordering to report any Poles fleeing from the Russian Partition of Poland. During the January Uprising local population was involved in smuggling and trading weapons to Polish fighters in Russian Empire.

In 1856 the town's Lutheran parish had 4,470 people, of which 3,150 were Poles. The town became part of the German Empire in 1871 during the unification of Germany. In 1874 the town's Lutheran parish had 7,047 members (including rural areas) from which 4,460 were Poles; the number decreased in 1885 to 3,160 as Germanization in the area progressed.

=== 20th century ===
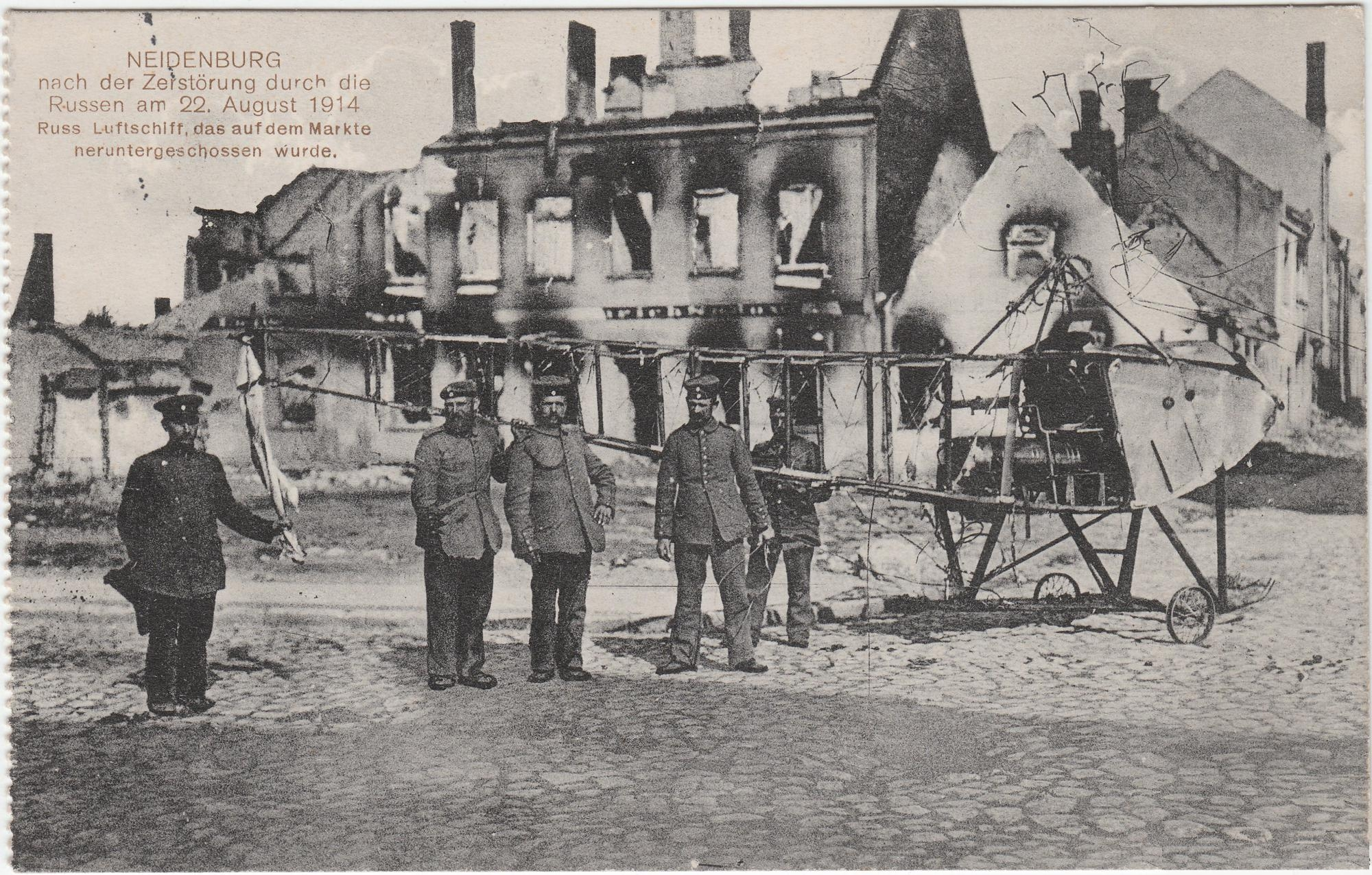
A Russian aircraft shot down at the market square, August 1914

At the beginning of World War I in 1914, Neidenburg was heavily damaged by invading Imperial Russian troops; 167 residential and agricultural houses, 8 public and 58 business buildings were destroyed by artillery fire on 22 August 1914. The town was reconquered and rebuilt by the Germans after the Battle of Tannenberg later in August 1914. The reconstruction was originally based on plans by Bodo Ebhardt, however, his neo-gothic style was not carried out; instead, a neoclassicist style was preferred. As a result of the Treaty of Versailles, the East Prussian plebiscite was organized under the control of the League of Nations on 11 July 1920. The votes were 3,156 for remaining in Prussia and 17 for joining Poland.

During the Kristallnacht riots in November 1938, the synagogue was destroyed and two Jewish inhabitants, Julius Naftali and Minna Zack, were killed by Nazi SA members, while several others were injured. The surviving members of the Jewish congregation were deported and killed in the Holocaust during World War II.

During World War II, the Germans operated a forced labour subcamp of the Stalag I-B prisoner-of-war camp in the town. A local branch of the Peasant Battalions was established by the Polish resistance. In October 1944, the city was bombed by the Soviets. Neidenburg was the seat of a district in East Prussia until 1945; in that year the Red Army entered and occupied the town while pursuing the retreating Wehrmacht. While many, if not most, German civilians had fled the area, many of those who remained experienced atrocities at the hands of Soviet soldiers, who found themselves on German soil for the first time. Lev Kopelev, a Soviet officer and later dissident, described how he was appalled by the acts of murder and looting against those who remained. In accordance to the Potsdam Agreement, the town along with most of historic Masuria became again part of Poland, and the remaining German population was expelled. Rather than being renamed to the traditional Polish name Nibork, the town received a new name, Nidzica. The town was significantly damaged during the war.

== Heritage monuments ==
Historic sights of Nidzica (examples)

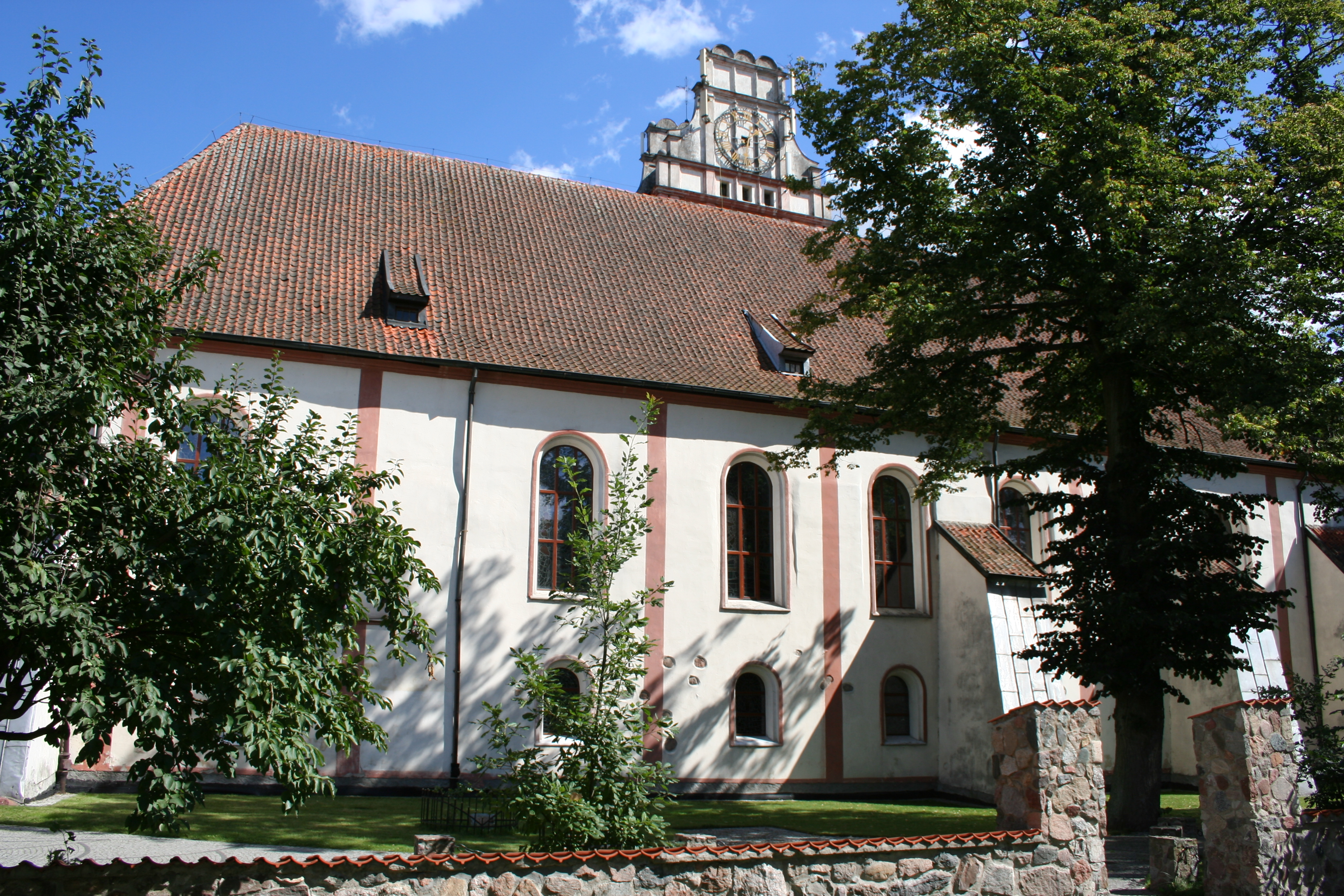
Immaculate Conception and Saint Adalbert church

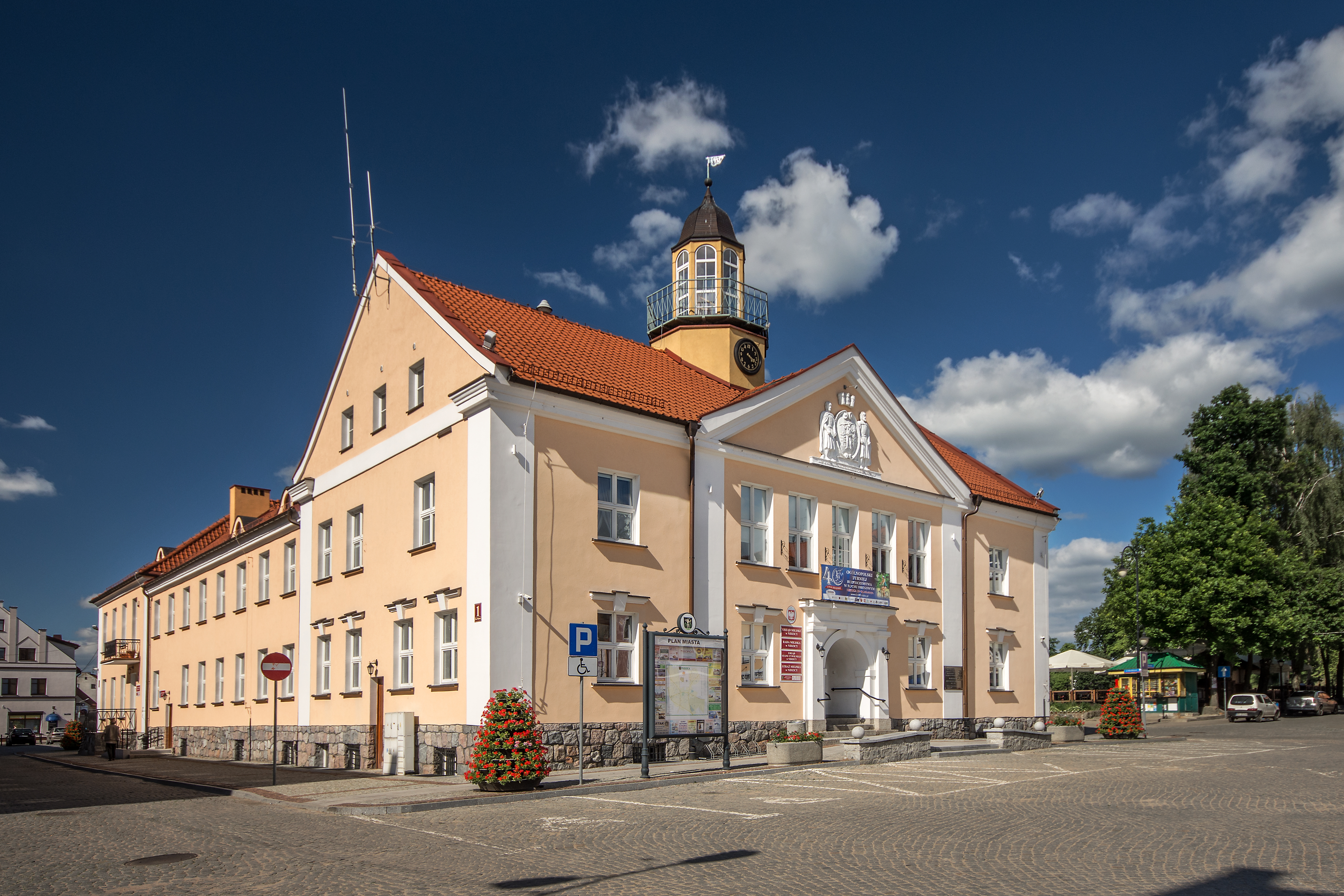
Town Hall

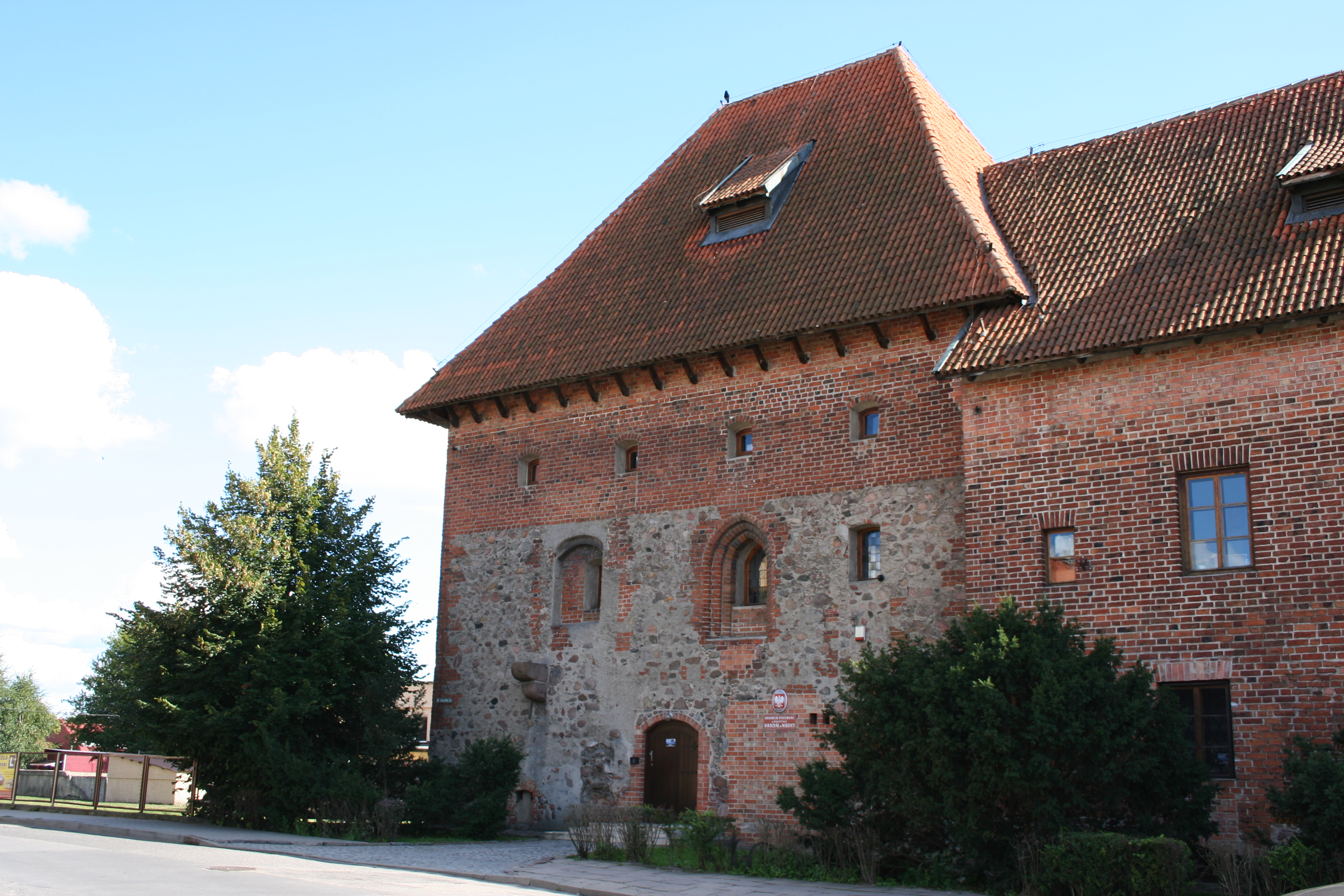
State Archives

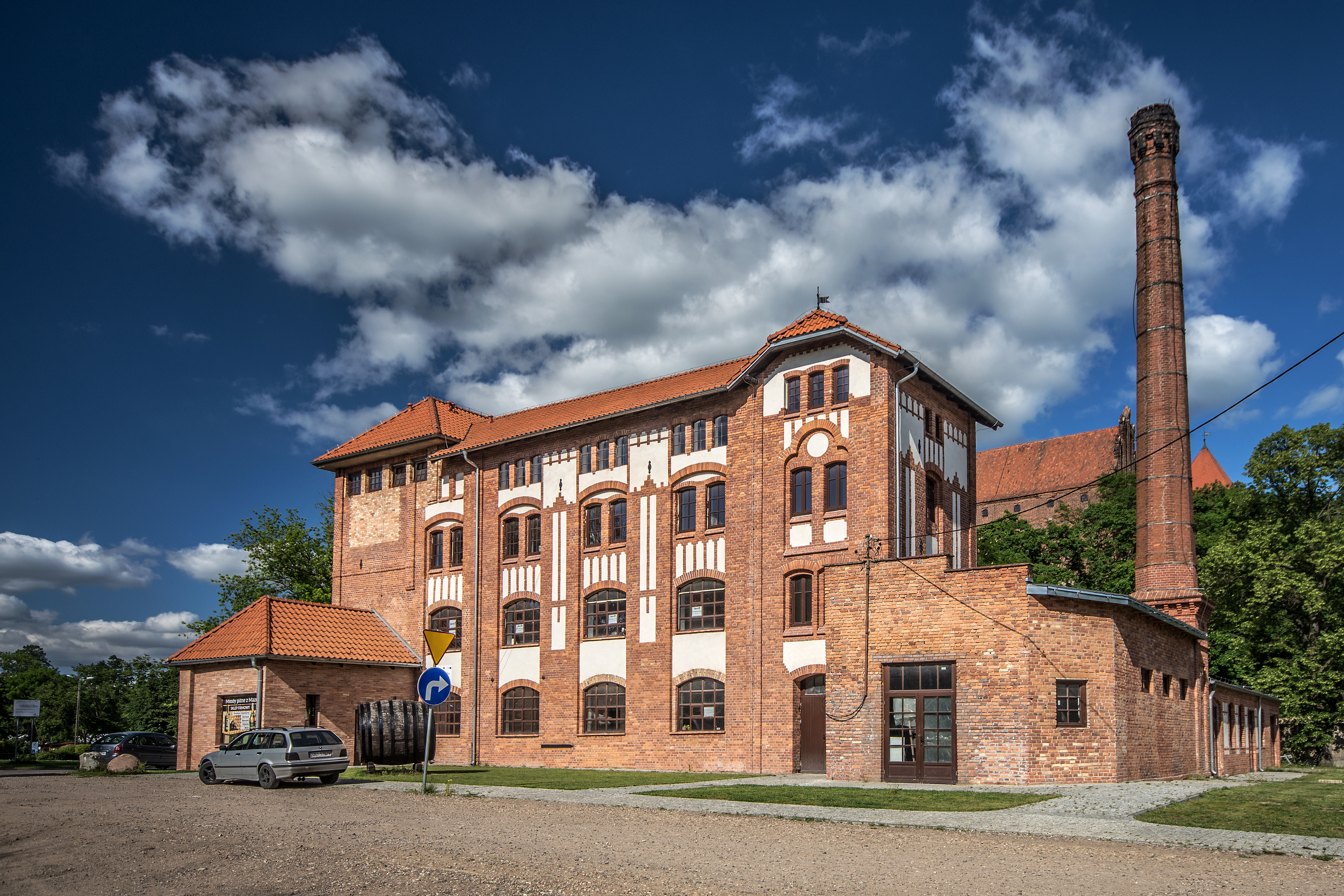
19th-century brewery

- Nidzica Castle, built in the 1370s
- Medieval building of the State Archives
- Medieval town walls
- Immaculate Conception and Saint Adalbert church (Gothic and Renaissance Revival)
- Holy Cross Church (Gothic Revival)
- 19th-century buildings, including the Town Hall (Ratusz), post office and old brewery
- Old granary
- Police station building
- Two Jewish cemeteries (19th-20th centuries)

== International relations ==
=== Twin towns — sister cities ===
Nidzica is twinned with:

- Bochum, Germany
- Gvardeysk, Russia

== Notable residents ==
- Ferdinand Gregorovius (1821–1891), historian
- Daniel Hermann (c. 1543-1601), humanist and poet
- Bethel Henry Strousberg (1823–1884), industrialist
- Georg Klebs (1857–1918), botanist
- Heinrich Lissauer (1861–1891), neurologist
- Walter Kollo (1878–1940), musician
- Rita Kuczynski (born 1944), German author, philosopher and editorialist
- Krystyna Szymańska-Lara (born 1969), Polish former basketball player who competed in the 2000 Summer Olympics
