= Somatosensory system =

Nerve system for sensing touch, temperature, body position, and pain

A multimodal (responds to multiple types of stimuli) sensory system that provides information on touch, temperature, pain and pressure to the organism.

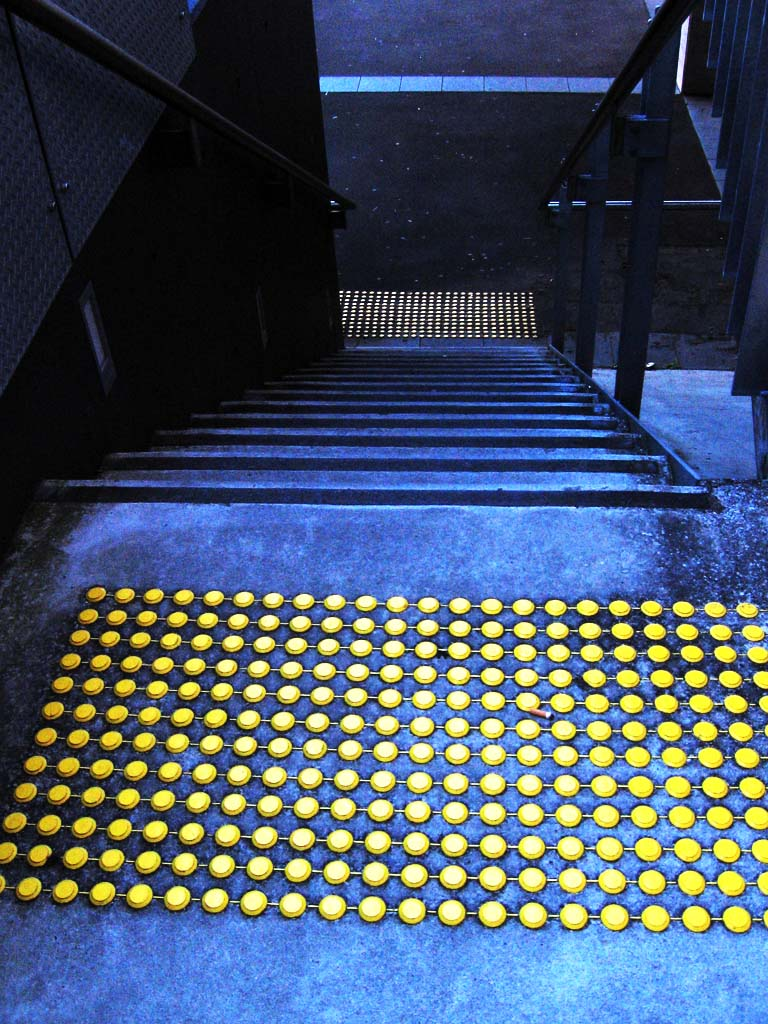
Touch is a crucial means of receiving information. This photo shows tactile markings identifying stairs for visually impaired people.

The somatosensory system, or somatic sensory system, is a subset of the sensory nervous system. The main functions of the somatosensory system are the perception of external stimuli, the perception of internal stimuli, and the regulation of body position and balance (proprioception). It is believed to act as a pathway between the different sensory modalities within the body.

As of 2024 debate continued on the underlying mechanisms, correctness and validity of the somatosensory system model, and whether it impacts emotions in the body.

The somatosensory system has been thought of as having two subdivisions;

- One for the detection of mechanosensory information related to touch. Mechanosensory information includes that of light touch, vibration, pressure and tension in the skin. Much of this information belongs to the sense of touch which is a general somatic sense in contrast to the special senses of sight, smell, taste, hearing, and balance.
- One for the nociception detection of pain and temperature. Nociceptory information is that received from pain and temperature that is deemed as harmful (noxious). Thermoreceptors relay temperature information in normal circumstances. Nociceptors are specialised receptors for signals of pain.

The sense of touch in perceiving the environment uses special sensory receptors in the skin called cutaneous receptors. They include mechanoreceptors such as tactile corpuscles that relay information about pressure and vibration; nociceptors, and thermoreceptors for temperature perception.

Stimulation of the receptors activate peripheral sensory neurons that convey signals to the spinal cord that may drive a responsive reflex, and may also be conveyed to the brain for conscious perception. Somatosensory information from the face and head enter the brain via cranial nerves such as the trigeminal nerve.

The neural pathways that go to the brain are structured such that information about the location of the physical stimulus is preserved. In this way, neighboring neurons in the somatosensory cortex represent nearby locations on the skin or in the body, creating a map or sensory homunculus.

== Touch communication ==
=== Tactile signing ===
Tactile signing is a common means of communication used by people with deafblindness. It is based on a sign language or another system of manual communication.

=== Emotion communication ===
Humans can communicate specific emotions through touch alone including anger, fear, disgust, love, gratitude, and sympathy via touch at much-better-than-chance levels.

== Overview ==
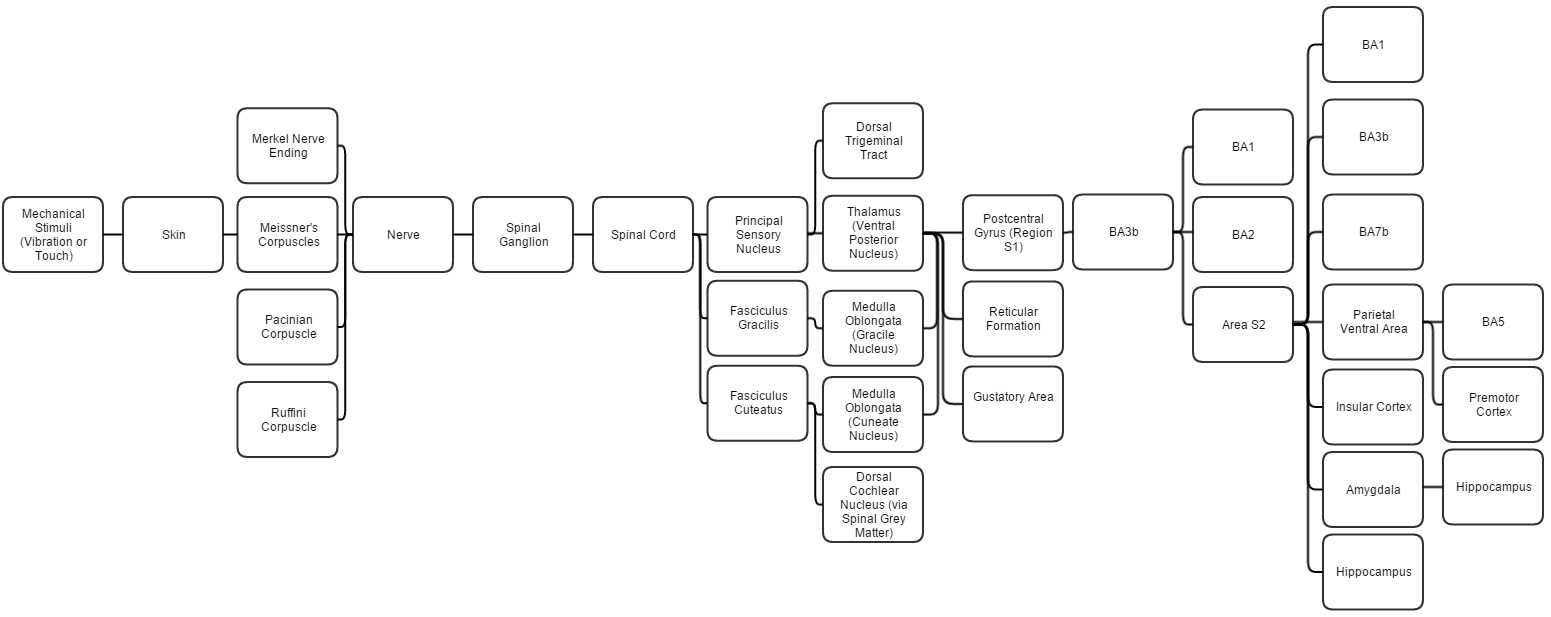
This diagram linearly (unless otherwise mentioned) tracks the projections of all known structures that allow for touch to their relevant endpoints in the human brain.

=== Sensory receptors ===
The two different types of mechanoreceptor in the skin are termed low-threshold mechanoreceptors, and high threshold mechanoreceptors. The four mechanoreceptors in glabrous skin are low-threshold that respond to harmless stimuli. They are innervated by four different afferent fibers. High-threshold mechanoreceptors, respond to harmful stimuli.

Merkel cell nerve endings are found in the basal epidermis and hair follicles; they react to low vibrations (5–15 Hz) and deep static touch such as shapes and edges. Due to having a small receptive field (extremely detailed information), they are used in areas like fingertips the most; they are not covered (shelled) and thus respond to pressures over long periods.

Tactile corpuscles react to moderate vibration (10–50 Hz) and light touch. They are located in the dermal papillae; due to their reactivity, they are primarily located in fingertips and lips. They respond in quick action potentials, unlike Merkel nerve endings. They are responsible for the ability to read Braille and feel gentle stimuli.

Pacinian corpuscles determine gross touch and distinguish rough and soft substances. They react in quick action potentials, especially to vibrations around 250 Hz (even up to centimeters away). They are the most sensitive to vibrations and have large receptor fields. Pacinian corpuscles react only to sudden stimuli so pressures like clothes that are always compressing their shape are quickly ignored. They have also been implicated in detecting the location of touch sensations on handheld tools.

Bulbous corpuscles react slowly and respond to sustained skin stretch. They are responsible for the feeling of object slippage and play a major role in the kinesthetic sense and control of finger position and movement. Merkel and bulbous cells - slow-response - are myelinated; the rest - fast-response - are not. All of these receptors are activated upon pressures that distort their shape causing an action potential.

=== Somatosensory cortex ===
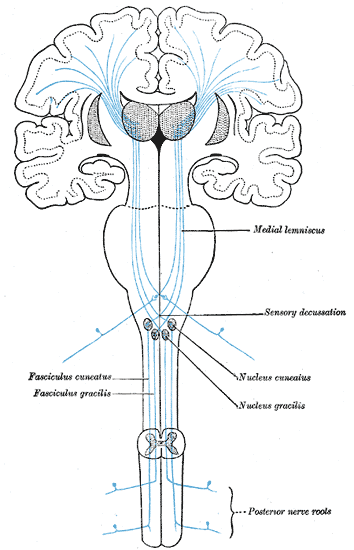
Gray's Anatomy, figure 759: the sensory tract, showing the pathway (blue) up the spinal cord, through the somatosensory thalamus, to S1 (Brodmann areas 3, 1, and 2), S2, and BA7

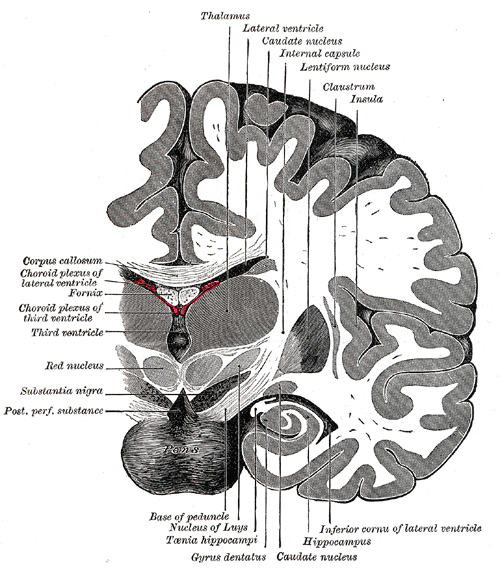
Gray's Anatomy, figure 717: detail showing path adjacent to the insular cortex (marked insula in this figure), adjacent to S1, S2, and BA7

The postcentral gyrus is in the parietal lobe and its cortex is the primary somatosensory cortex (Brodmann areas 3, 2 and 1) collectively referred to as S1.

BA3 receives the densest projections from the thalamus. BA3a is involved with the sense of relative position of neighboring body parts and amount of effort being used during movement. BA3b is responsible for distributing somatosensory information, it projects texture information to BA1 and shape and size information to BA2.

Region S2 (secondary somatosensory cortex) divides into Area S2 and parietal ventral area. Area S2 is involved with specific touch perception and is thus integrally linked with the amygdala and hippocampus to encode and reinforce memories.

Parietal ventral area is the somatosensory relay to the premotor cortex and somatosensory memory hub, BA5.

BA5 is the topographically organized somato memory field and association area.

BA1 processes texture info while BA2 processes size and shape information.

Area S2 processes light touch, pain, visceral sensation, and tactile attention.

S1 processes the remaining info (crude touch, pain, temperature).

BA7 integrates visual and proprioceptive info to locate objects in space.

The insular cortex (insula) plays a role in the sense of bodily-ownership, bodily self-awareness, and perception. Insula also plays a role in conveying info about sensual touch, pain, temperature, itch, and local oxygen status. Insula is a highly connected relay and thus is involved in numerous functions.

== Structure ==
The somatosensory system is spread through all major parts of the vertebrate body. It consists both of sensory receptors and sensory neurons in the periphery (skin, muscle and organs for example), to deeper neurons within the central nervous system.

== General somatosensory pathway ==
All afferent touch/vibration information ascends the spinal cord via the dorsal column-medial lemniscus pathway via gracilis (T7 and below) or cuneatus (T6 and above). Cuneatus sends signals to the cochlear nucleus indirectly via spinal grey matter, this info is used in determining if a perceived sound is just villi noise/irritation. All fibers cross (left becomes right) in the medulla.

A somatosensory pathway will typically have three neurons: first-order, second-order, and third-order.

1. The first-order neuron is a type of pseudounipolar neuron and always has its cell body in the dorsal root ganglion of the spinal nerve with a peripheral axon innervating touch mechanoreceptors and a central axon synapsing on the second-order neuron. If the somatosensory pathway is in parts of the head or neck not covered by the cervical nerves, the first-order neuron will be the trigeminal nerve ganglia or the ganglia of other sensory cranial nerves).
2. The second-order neuron has its cell body either in the spinal cord or in the brainstem. This neuron's ascending axons will cross (decussate) to the opposite side either in the spinal cord or in the brainstem.
3. In the case of touch and certain types of pain, the third-order neuron has its cell body in the ventral posterior nucleus of the thalamus and ends in the postcentral gyrus of the parietal lobe in the primary somatosensory cortex (or S1).

Photoreceptors, similar to those found in the retina of the eye, detect potentially damaging ultraviolet radiation (ultraviolet A specifically), inducing increased production of melanin by melanocytes. Thus tanning potentially offers the skin rapid protection from DNA damage and sunburn caused by ultraviolet radiation (DNA damage caused by ultraviolet B). However, whether this offers protection is debatable, because the amount of melanin released by this process is modest in comparison to the amounts released in response to DNA damage caused by ultraviolet B radiation.

=== Tactile feedback ===
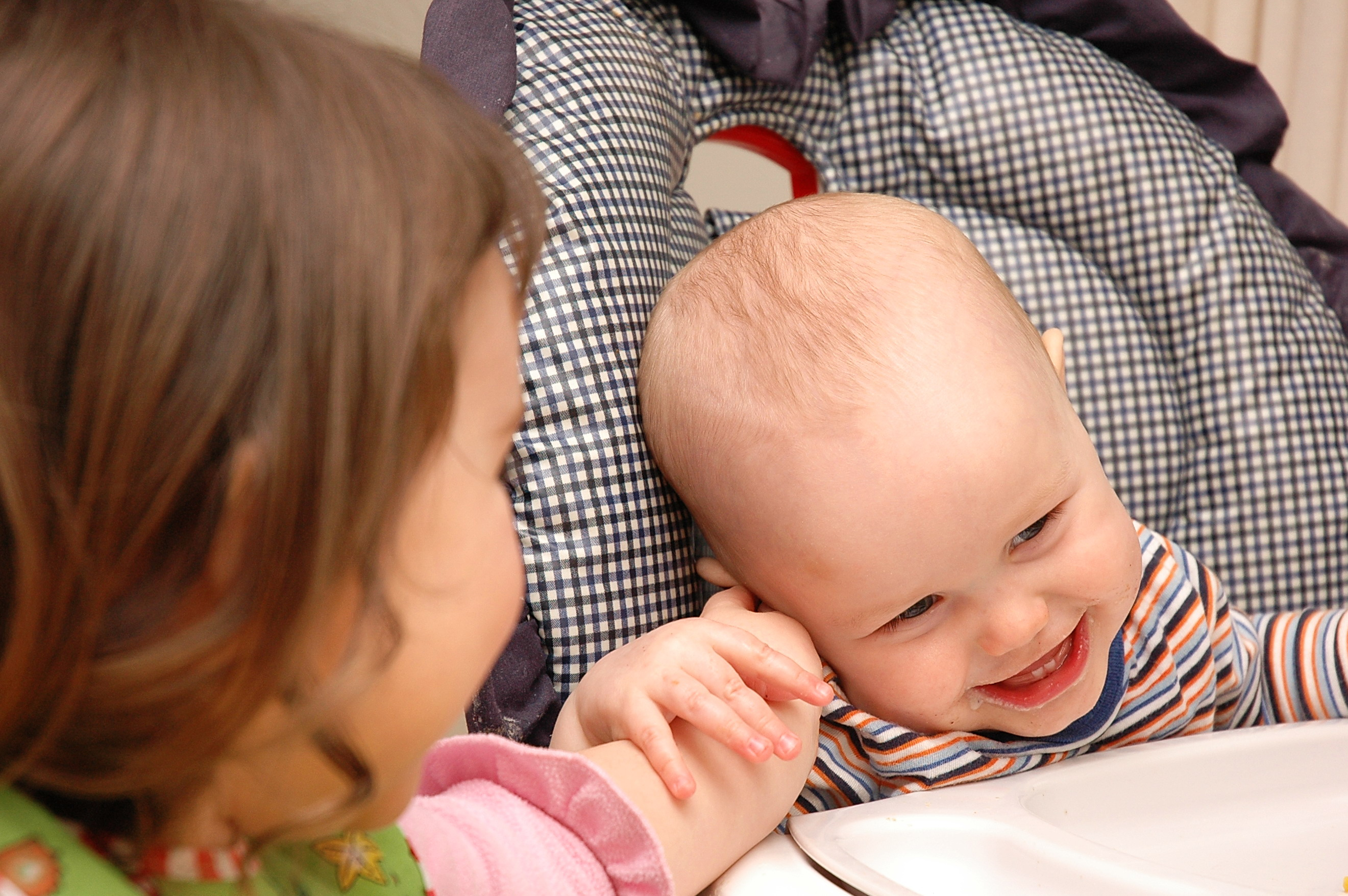
Touch can result in many different physiological reactions such as laughing at being tickled.

The tactile feedback from proprioception is derived from the proprioceptors in the skin, muscles, and joints.

=== Balance ===
The receptor for the sense of balance resides in the vestibular system in the ear (for the three-dimensional orientation of the head, and by inference, the rest of the body). Balance is also mediated by the kinesthetic reflex fed by proprioception (which senses the relative location of the rest of the body to the head). In addition, proprioception estimates the location of objects which are sensed by the visual system (which provides confirmation of the place of those objects relative to the body), as input to the mechanical reflexes of the body.

=== Fine touch and crude touch ===
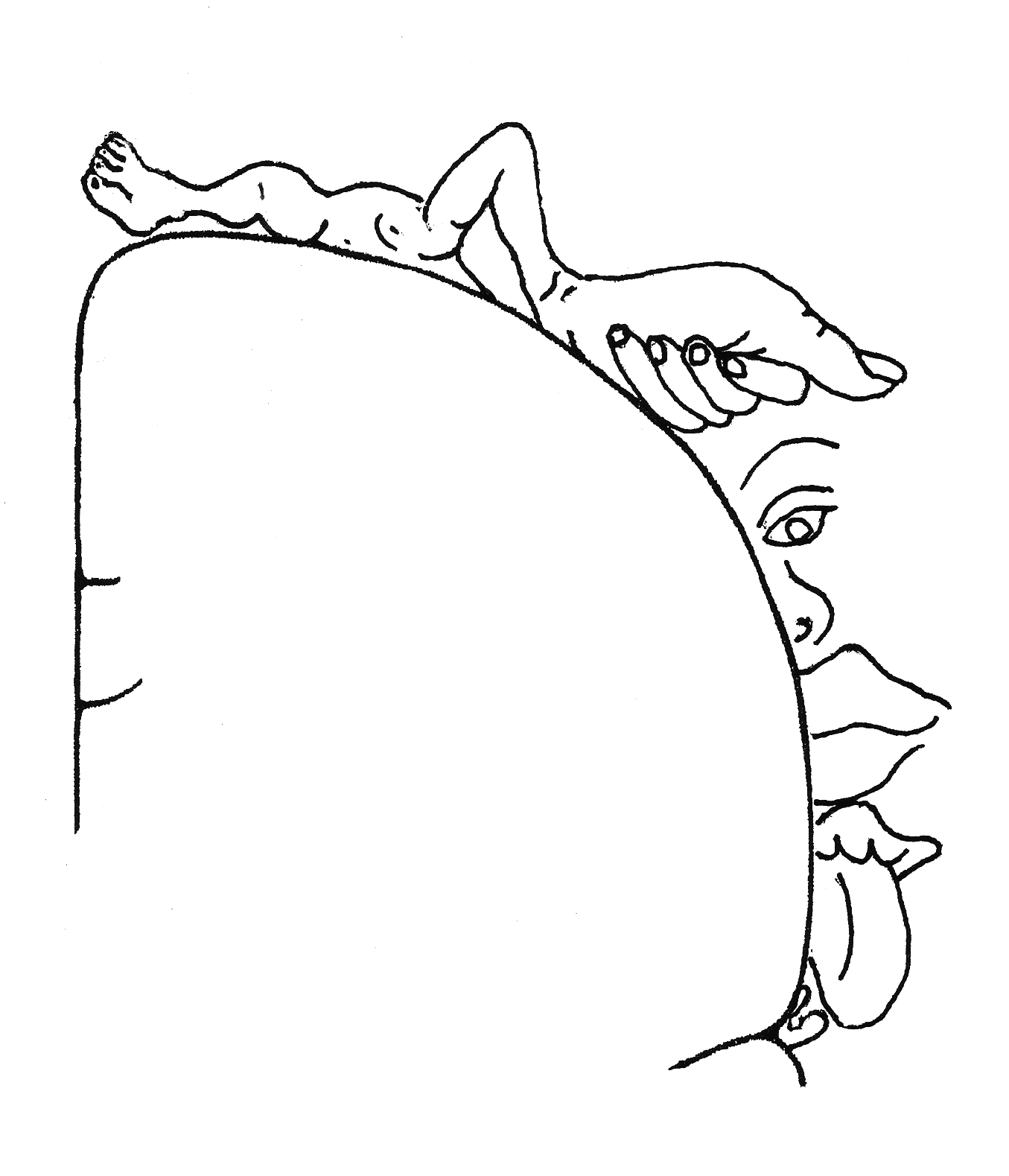
The cortical homunculus, a map of somatosensory areas of the brain, was devised by Wilder Penfield.

Fine touch (or discriminative touch) is a sensory modality that allows a subject to sense and localize touch. The form of touch where localization is not possible is known as crude touch. The dorsal column–medial lemniscus pathway is the pathway responsible for the sending of fine touch information to the cerebral cortex of the brain.

Crude touch (non-discriminating) is a sensory modality that allows the subject to sense that something has touched them, without being able to localize where they were touched (contrasting "fine touch"). Its fibres are carried in the spinothalamic tract, unlike the fine touch, which is carried in the dorsal column. As fine touch normally works in parallel to crude touch, a person will be able to localize touch until fibres carrying fine touch (in the dorsal column–medial lemniscus pathway) have been disrupted. Then the subject will feel the touch, but be unable to identify where they were touched.

=== Neural processing of social touch ===
The somatosensory cortex encodes incoming sensory information from receptors all over the body. Affective touch is a type of sensory information that elicits an emotional reaction and is usually social in nature, such as a physical human touch. This type of information is actually coded differently than other sensory information. Intensity of affective touch is still encoded in the primary somatosensory cortex and is processed in a similar way to emotions invoked by sight and sound, as exemplified by the increase of adrenaline caused by the social touch of a loved one, as opposed to the physical inability to touch someone you do not love.

Meanwhile, the feeling of pleasantness associated with affective touch activates the anterior cingulate cortex more than the primary somatosensory cortex. Functional magnetic resonance imaging (fMRI) data shows that increased blood-oxygen-level contrast (BOLD) signal in the anterior cingulate cortex as well as the prefrontal cortex is highly correlated with pleasantness scores of an affective touch. Inhibitory transcranial magnetic stimulation (TMS) of the primary somatosensory cortex inhibits the perception of affective touch intensity, but not affective touch pleasantness. Therefore, the S1 is not directly involved in processing socially affective touch pleasantness, but still plays a role in discriminating touch location and intensity.

Tactile interaction is important amongst some animals. Usually, tactile contact between two animals occurs through stroking, licking, or grooming. These behaviours are essential for the individual's social healthcare, as in the hypothalamus they induce the release of oxytocin, a hormone that decreases stress and anxiety and increases social bonding between animals.

More precisely, the consistency of oxytocin neuron activation in rats stroked by humans has been observed, especially in the caudal paraventricular nucleus. It was found that this affiliative relationship induced by tactile contact is common no matter the relationship between the two individuals (mother-infant, male-female, human-animal). It has also been discovered that the level of oxytocin release through this behaviour correlates with the time course of social interaction as longer stroking induced a greater release of the hormone.

The importance of somatosensory stimulation in social animals such as primates has also been observed. Grooming is part of the social interaction primates exert on their conspecifics. This interaction is required between individuals to maintain the affiliative relationship within the group, avoid internal conflict and increase group bonding. However, such social interaction requires the recognition of every member in the group. As such, it has been observed that the size of the neocortex is positively correlated with the size of the group, reflecting a limit to the number of recognizable members amongst which grooming can occur. Furthermore, the time course of grooming is related to vulnerability due to predation to which animals are exposed to whilst performing such social interaction. The relationship between tactile interaction, stress reduction and social bonding depends on the evaluation of risks that occur during conducting such behaviours in the wild life, and further research is required to unveil the connection between tactile caring and fitness level.

Studies show a correlation between touching a soft or hard object and how a person thinks or even makes decisions. Further, between the firmness of a touch and the evoking of gender stereotyping.

Tactile memories as part of haptic memory, are organized somatotopically, following the organization of the somatosensory cortex.

=== Individual variation ===
A variety of studies have measured and investigated the causes for differences between individuals in the sense of fine touch. One well-studied area is passive tactile spatial acuity, the ability to resolve the fine spatial details of an object pressed against the stationary skin. A variety of methods have been used to measure passive tactile spatial acuity, perhaps the most rigorous being the grating orientation task. In this task subjects identify the orientation of a grooved surface presented in two different orientations, which can be applied manually or with automated equipment. Many studies have shown a decline in passive tactile spatial acuity with age; the reasons for this decline are unknown, but may include loss of tactile receptors during normal aging. Remarkably, index finger passive tactile spatial acuity is better among adults with smaller index fingertips; this effect of finger size has been shown to underlie the better passive tactile spatial acuity of women, on average, compared to men. The density of tactile corpuscles, a type of mechanoreceptor that detects low-frequency vibrations, is greater in smaller fingers; the same may hold for Merkel cells, which detect the static indentations important for fine spatial acuity. Among children of the same age, those with smaller fingers also tend to have better tactile acuity. Many studies have shown that passive tactile spatial acuity is enhanced among blind individuals compared to sighted individuals of the same age, possibly because of cross modal plasticity in the cerebral cortex of blind individuals. Perhaps also due to cortical plasticity, individuals who have been blind since birth reportedly consolidate tactile information more rapidly than sighted people.

== Clinical significance ==
A somatosensory deficiency may be caused by a peripheral neuropathy involving peripheral nerves of the somatosensory system. This may present as numbness or paresthesia.

== Society and culture ==
Haptic technology can provide touch sensation in virtual and real environments. In the field of speech therapy, tactile feedback can be used to treat speech disorders.

Affectionate touch is present in everyday life and can take multiple forms. These actions, however, seem to carry specific functions even though the evolutionary benefit from such a wide range of behaviours is not entirely understood. Researchers investigated the expression patterns and characteristics of 8 different affectionate touch actions - embracing, holding, kissing, leaning, petting, squeezing, stroking, and tickling - in a self-report study. It was found that the affectionate touch has distinct target areas on the body, different associated affect, comfort-value, and expression frequency based on the type of touch action that is performed.

Besides the rather obvious sensory consequences of touch, it can also affect higher-level aspects of cognition such as social judgements and decision-making. This effect might arise due to a physical-to-mental scaffolding process in early development, whereby sensorimotor experiences are linked to the emergence of conceptual knowledge. Such links might be maintained throughout life, and so touching an object may cue the physical sensation to its related conceptual processing. Indeed, it was found that different physical properties - weight, texture, and hardness - of a touched object can influence social judgement and decision-making. For example, participants described a passage of a social interaction to be harsher when they touched a hard wooden block instead of a soft blanket prior to the task. Building on these findings, the ability of touch to have an unconscious influence on such higher-order thoughts may provide a novel tool for marketing and communication strategies.

== Plasticity in the somatosensory cortex ==
The sensory maps in the cortex can change over time through a process called cortical plasticity or functional reorganization. This means that experience can change the size and shape of these sensory maps.

== See also ==
- Allochiria
- Cell signalling
- Golgi tendon organ
- Haptic communication
- Haptic perception
- Interoception
- Muscle spindle
- Molecular cellular cognition
- Phantom limb
- Physical intimacy
- Sensory maps
- Special senses
- Supramarginal gyrus
- Tactile illusion
- Vibratese, method of communication through touch
- Tactile imaging
