= Cutaneous receptor =

Type of sensory receptor

A cutaneous receptor is a sensory receptor found in the skin that provides information about temperature, touch (including vibration and pain), spatial orientation, pressure (stretching or squeezing), and metabolic circumstances (including those induced by external chemical substances). The main four types of cutaneous receptors are tactile corpuscles, bulbous corpuscles, Pacinian corpuscles, and Merkel nerve endings, although the latter do not qualify as sensory corpuscles in the narrow sense.

== Types ==
The sensory receptors in the skin are:

- Mechanoreceptors
  - Bulbous corpuscles (skin stretch)
  - Bulboid corpuscles (Cold)
  - Tactile corpuscles (changes in texture, slow vibrations)
  - Pacinian corpuscles (deep pressure, fast vibrations)
  - Merkel nerve endings (sustained touch and pressure)
  - Free nerve endings
- Thermoreceptor
- Nociceptors
- Chemoreceptors

== Modalities ==
With the above-mentioned receptor types the skin can sense the modalities touch, pressure, vibration, temperature and pain. The modalities and their receptors are partly overlapping, and are innervated by different kinds of fiber types.

Cutaneous receptors
Modality	Type	Fiber type
Touch	Rapidly adapting cutaneous mechanoreceptors (tactile corpuscles Pacinian corpuscles hair follicle receptors some free nerve endings)	Aβ fibers
Touch and pressure	Slowly adapting cutaneous mechanoreceptors (Merkel nerve ending and bulbous corpuscles some free nerve endings)	Aβ fibers (Merkel and Ruffini's), Aδ fibers (free nerve endings)
Vibration	Tactile corpuscles and Pacinian corpuscles	Aβ fibers
Temperature	Thermoreceptors	Aδ fibers (cold receptors); C fibers (warmth receptors)
Pain and Itch	Free nerve ending nociceptors	Aδ fibers (Nociceptors of neospinothalamic tract); C fibers (Nociceptors of paleospinothalamic tract)

== Morphology ==
Cutaneous receptors are at the ends of afferent neurons. works within the capsule. Ion channels are situated near these networks.

In sensory transduction, the afferent nerves transmit through a series of synapses in the central nervous system, first in the spinal cord, the ventrobasal portion of the thalamus, and then on to the somatosensory cortex.

== See also ==
- Sense
- Receptor
- Skin
- Epithelium
- Opsin § Opsins in the human eye, brain, and skin
