= End organ =

The term end organ or end-organ has two meanings in medicine:

- A small organ at the terminal end of a nerve conduction pathway
  - Bulbous corpuscle (Ruffini corpuscle end-organ)
  - Tactile corpuscle (Meissner corpuscle end-organ)
  - Merkel nerve ending (Merkel corpuscle end-organ)
  - Neuromuscular junction (motor end-organ)
  - Lamellar corpuscle (Pacinian corpuscle end-organ)
- The ultimately affected organ in a chain of events, such as a disease process (pathophysiology) or a drug's mechanism of action (sometimes called a target organ in this sense)
    - End organ damage, disease of such organs
      - Ambulatory blood pressure § Target organ damage
      - Sepsis § End-organ dysfunction
      - HFE hereditary haemochromatosis § End-organ damage
