= Tegula =

Tegula can mean:

- Teulada, Italy, called Tegula during Roman times

Tegula, plural tegulae is in origin the Latin word for "tile" and may refer to:

- Tegula (gastropod), a genus of marine snails
- Tegula (insect anatomy), a part of the wings attached to the mesothorax, in various insects
- Tegula (primate anatomy), claw-like nails found in New World monkeys
- Imbrex and tegula, interlocking roofing tiles used in ancient Greek and Roman architecture
