= Georg Meissner =

German anatomist and physiologist

George Meissner
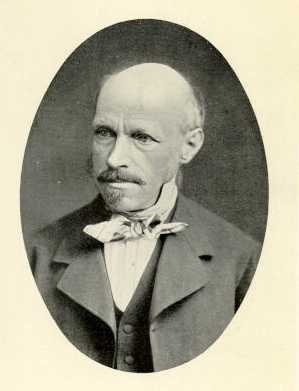
- Born: 19 November 1829; Hanover, Kingdom of Hanover
- Died: 30 March 1905 (aged 75)
- Occupations: Anatomist, physiologist

George Meissner (19 November 1829 – 30 March 1905) was a German anatomist and physiologist born in Hanover.

He studied medicine at the University of Göttingen, where he worked closely with Rudolf Wagner (1806–1864). In 1851 he accompanied Wagner and Theodor Billroth (1829–1894) on an expedition to Trieste, where he performed scientific studies of torpedo fish. In 1852 he earned his doctorate at Göttingen, and was later a university professor at Basel (from 1855), Freiburg (from 1857) and Göttingen (1860–1901).

His name is associated with Meissner's corpuscles, which are mechanoreceptors that are responsible for sensitivity to light touch. They were first described in 1852, with Meissner and Wagner each feeling that he alone should be given priority as to discovery of the corpuscles. A controversy took place between the two men, causing a strained relationship that lasted for several years. His name is also associated with Meissner's plexus, being described as the plexus submucosus of the alimentary tract. He also conducted research of physiological–chemical problems, in particular studies on the nature and the breakdown of proteins in the digestive system.

Meissner was the doctoral advisor of Robert Koch who is considered one of the main founders of modern bacteriology and recipient of the Nobel Prize in Physiology or Medicine in 1905.

== Written works ==
- Beitraege zur Anatomie und Physiologie der Haut, Leipzig 1853
- Beiträge zur Physiologie des Sehorgans, Leipzig 1854
- Über die Nerven der Darmwand, Z Ration Med N F 8: 364–366 Meissner G. (1857)
- Untersuchungen über den Sauerstoff, Hannover: Hahn, 1863
- Zur Funktion der Knäueldrüsen, In: Zwei vergessene Arbeiten aus der klassischen Periode der Hautanatomie of Paul Gerson Unna, Hamburg: Voss 1889
