= Bulboid corpuscle =

Cutaneous receptor in the human eye

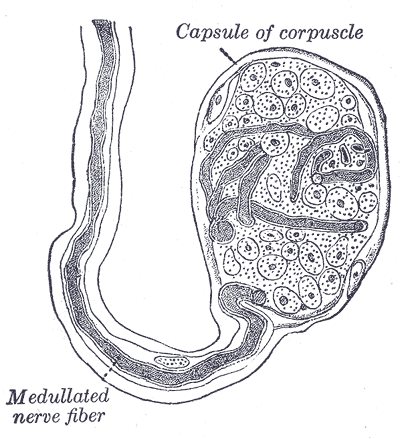
- End-bulb of Krause.

Details

Identifiers
- Latin: corpuscula bulboideum
- FMA: 83603

The bulboid corpuscles (end-bulbs of Krause, Krause corpuscles) are cutaneous receptors in humans and other animals.

The end-bulbs of Krause were named after the German anatomist Wilhelm Krause (1833–1910).

== Function ==
The end-bulbs of Krause were thought to be thermoreceptors, sensing cold temperatures, but in early research their function remained unknown. Recently optogenetic studies revealed their role in sexual stimulation and mating behavior in mice:

"Optogenetic activation of male Krause corpuscle afferent terminals evoked penile erection, while genetic ablation of Krause corpuscles impaired intromission and ejaculation of males as well as reduced sexual receptivity of females. Thus, Krause corpuscles, which are particularly dense in the clitoris, are vibrotactile sensors crucial for normal sexual behavior."

== Structure ==
They are minute cylindrical or oval bodies, consisting of a capsule formed by the expansion of the connective-tissue sheath of a medullated fiber, and containing a soft semifluid core in which the axis-cylinder terminates either in a bulbous extremity or in a coiled-up plexiform mass.

== Location ==
End-bulbs are found in the conjunctiva of the eye (where they are spheroidal in shape in humans, but cylindrical in most other animals), in the mucous membrane of the lips and tongue, and in the epineurium of nerve trunks.

Krause corpuscles are found in the penis and the clitoris and sometimes are referred to as genital corpuscles; in these situations they have a mulberry-like appearance, being constricted by connective-tissue septa into from two to six knob-like masses.

In the synovial membranes of certain joints, e. g., those of the fingers, rounded or oval end-bulbs occur, and are designated articular end-bulbs.
