= Udea suralis =

Scientific classification
- Kingdom: Animalia
- Phylum: Arthropoda
- Clade: Pancrustacea
- Class: Insecta
- Order: Lepidoptera
- Family: Crambidae
- Genus: Udea
- Species: U. suralis

Binomial name
- Udea suralis (Schaus, 1933)

Synonyms
- Hapalia suralis Schaus, 1933

Species of moth

Udea suralis is a moth in the family Crambidae known only from its type specimen. It was described in 1933 based a specimen collected from São Paulo Brazil.

== Description ==
The type specimen of Udea suralis (originally described as Hapalia suralis) is an adult female collected from São Paulo, Brazil. It is held at the American Museum of Natural History.

U. suralis was one of a number of specimens described by the lepidopterist William Schaus in a series of articles published across multiple volumes of the Annals and Magazine of Natural History.

== Morphology ==
The type specimen was female and measured 32mm in length.

=== Forewing ===
Schaus describes the forewing as cinnamon-colored with a pinkish hue and the terminal wing and wing base. The forewing is patterned with several white spots edged with "mikado-brown" (a color similar to chestnut). The edge of the forewing is bordered by a fine "snuff-brown" (grayish brown to yellow-brown) line. The edge of the wing is lined with whitish cilia (a fine, hair-like fringe).

=== Hindwing ===
The hindwing of U. suralis is somewhat punctiform with a slight retraction at the second vein. The hindwing is white and semi-translucent with a cinnamon-buff distal edge (termen); this is bordered inwardly by a dentate brownish line and outwardly by a darker "mikado-brown" (chestnut) line.

=== Head and body ===
U. suralis has a clay-colored head, collar (the area between the head and thorax) and tegulae. The dorsal palpi are cinnamon-colored while the ventral palpi are buff-white. Schaus describes the color of abdomen as "vinaceous-buff" (i.e. wine red-buff).
