= Tegula (insect anatomy) =

Sclerite in insect anatomy

A tegula is a small sclerite situated above the base of the costal vein in the wings of various insects such as Orthoptera, Lepidoptera, Hymenoptera, Diptera, and Auchenorrhyncha, and attached to the anterolateral portion of the mesonotum. It is densely innervated, with sensory bristles, campaniform sensilla, as well as a chordotonal organ in some species.

The tegula in locusts is a model system for studying the role of feedback from mechanoreceptors during movement. In locusts, the tegula directly controls flight muscles. The motor neurons that control the activation of the wing elevator muscles are phase-locked to the neurons that innervate the tegula such that when the tegula is electrically stimulated the elevator muscles initiate an upstroke. When the tegula is removed, locust flight is clumsy and disordered at first but most animals adapt, suggesting the use of other mechanoreceptors to control flight.

The tegula system is also a model for studying the role of neuromodulation in state-dependent motor control. Neural signals from the tegula only initiate wing muscle contraction when the animal is in flight (or fictive flight) due to endogenous release of the neuromodulator octopamine. This mechanism ensures that the animal does not initiate a wing stroke if the bristles are deflected by the wind as the animal is walking.

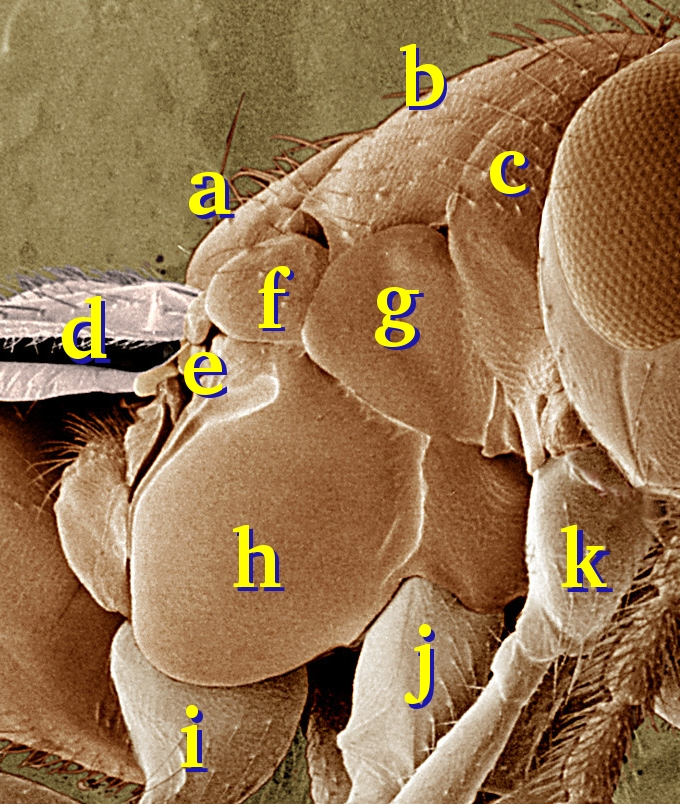
The tegula is labeled f on this encyrtid. Click for an uncropped version.
