= Free nerve ending =

Type of nerve fiber carrying sensory signals

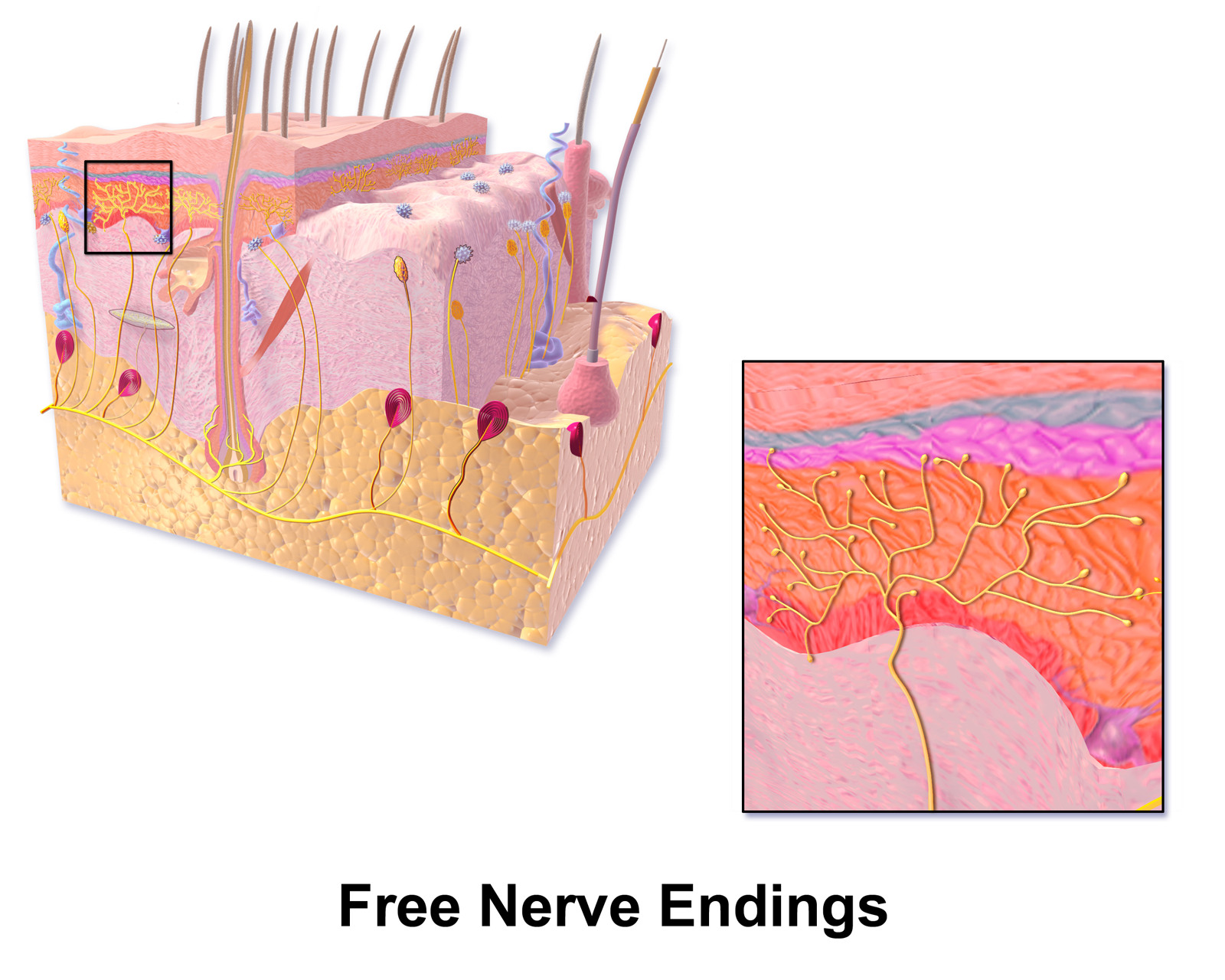
- Illustration of free nerve endings

Details

Identifiers
- Latin: terminatio neuralis libera
- TH: H3.11.06.0.00002
- FMA: 84005

A free nerve ending (FNE) or bare nerve ending, is an unspecialized, afferent nerve fiber sending its signal to a sensory neuron. Afferent in this case means bringing information from the body's periphery toward the brain. They function as cutaneous nociceptors and are essentially used by vertebrates to detect noxious stimuli that often result in pain.

== Structure ==
Free nerve endings are unencapsulated and have no complex sensory structures. They are the most common type of nerve ending, and are most frequently found in the skin. They penetrate the dermis and end in the stratum granulosum. FNEs infiltrate the middle layers of the dermis and surround hair follicles.

== Types ==
Free nerve endings have different rates of adaptation, stimulus modalities, and fiber types.

=== Rate of adaptation ===
Different types of FNE can be rapidly adapting, intermediate adapting, or slowly adapting. A delta type II fibers are fast-adapting while A delta type I and C fibers are slowly adapting.

=== Modality ===
Free nerve endings can detect temperature, mechanical stimuli (touch, pressure, stretch) or danger (nociception). Thus, different free nerve endings work as thermoreceptors, cutaneous mechanoreceptors and nociceptors. In other words, they express polymodality.

=== Fiber types ===
The majority of Aδ (A delta) fibers (group III) and C (group IV) fibers end as free nerve endings.

=== Classification ===
The term "free nerve endings" dates back to the 1890s, originally characterized by the absence of other cellular structures at their terminals. Observations that led to this characterization were limited by the relatively low resolution of light microscopes. Advances in non-optical imaging such as electron microscopy allowed for higher resolution examination of free nerve endings, enabling the finding that they are most often bundles of axons surrounded by a Remak bundle rather than truly unenclosed. Such discoveries have led to the proposal of more accurate terminology such as "fine nerve endings" or "non-corpuscular afferent nerve endings."
