= Mechanoreceptors (in plants) =

Sensory organ or cell

A mechanoreceptor is a sensory organ or cell that responds to mechanical stimulation such as touch, pressure, vibration, and sound from both the internal and external environment. Mechanoreceptors are well-documented in animals and are integrated into the nervous system as sensory neurons. While plants do not have nerves or a nervous system like animals, they also contain mechanoreceptors that perform a similar function. Mechanoreceptors detect mechanical stimulus originating from within the plant (intrinsic) and from the surrounding environment (extrinsic). The ability to sense vibrations, touch, or other disturbance is an adaptive response to herbivory and attack so that the plant can appropriately defend itself against harm. Mechanoreceptors can be organized into three levels: molecular, cellular, and organ-level.

== Mechanism of sensation ==
=== Signal ===
There is a growing body of knowledge about how mechanoreceptors in plant cells receive information about a mechanical stimulation, but there are many gaps in the current understanding. While a complete model cannot yet be formed, we do know much of what is happening at the plasma membrane.

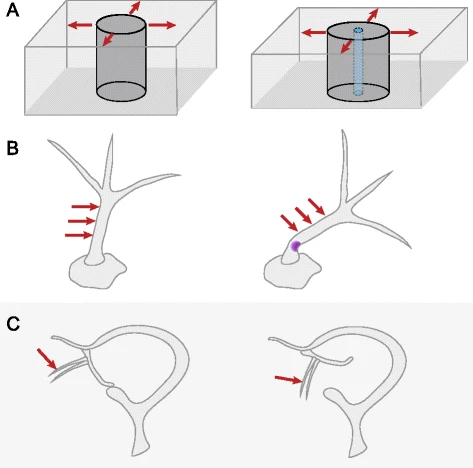
Mechanoreceptors changing shape in response to mechanical stimuli (red arrows)

The plasma membrane is full of membrane proteins and ion channels. One type of ion channel are Mechanosensitive (MS) ion channels. MS channels are different from other membrane proteins in that their primary gating stimulus is force, such that they open conduits for ions to pass through the membrane in response to mechanical stimuli. This system allows physical force to create an ion flux, which then results in signal integration and response (as detailed below). MS channels are hypothesized to be the working mechanism in the perception of gravity, vibration, touch, hyper-osmotic and hypo-osmotic stress, pathogenic invasion, and interaction with commensal microbes. MS channels have been discovered across a diverse array of genera as well as in different plant organs, like leaves and stems, and localize to diverse cellular membranes.

Not only can mechanoreceptors be present within the plasma membrane of cells, but they can also exist as whole cells whose primary purpose is to detect mechanical stimuli. A well known example is the trigger hairs on the venus fly trap . When repeatedly touched within a certain time span, the plant will snap shut, entrapping and digesting its prey.

=== Integration and response ===
Once the plant perceives a mechanical stimulus via mechanoreceptor cells or mechanoreceptor proteins within the plasma membrane of a cell, the resulting ion flux is integrated through signaling pathways resulting in a response. The signaling cascade (integration) and response is dependent on the type of stimulus and the particular species. For instance, it can manifest as a change in turgor pressure resulting in movement, secretion of defense chemicals, and the closing of stomata.

== Examples ==
=== Venus flytrap ===
Dionaea muscipula (Venus fly-trap) is known to rapidly close its lobes when touched to capture and digest its prey. The unique carnivorous plant has extremely sensitive mechanosensory hairs located on the surface of its trap. When one hair is touched by its prey, anion channels will open and depolarize the plasma membrane thus firing an action potential (AP) through the phloem. The AP results in the accumulation of Ca2+ ions. If the hairs are then left alone, the Ca2+ will dissipate. If another hair is stimulated within 30 seconds of the first hair, however, another AP will fire and the [Ca+] will reach a threshold triggering changes in cell turgor in the petiole. This will cause the trap to swiftly snap shut, trapping the pray inside its lobes.

As the prey moves around within the trap, it bumps the mechanosensory hairs more thus inducing repetitive firing of AP's. Just three AP's (including the initial two) initiate the production of Jasmonic Acid hormone signaling pathways, creating an airtight seal, beginning the secretion of digestive enzymes and up-regulating the production of transporters for nutrient-uptake.

=== Arabidopsis thaliana ===
When caterpillars chew on leaves, they create a very specific vibrational pattern. Arabidopsis thaliana plants have adapted to elicit chemical defenses when they detect these mechanical vibration patterns to protect themselves from continued herbivory. While the signal perception, integration, and response for this system has not yet been thoroughly researched, the general guidelines for mechanosensory stimulation are thought to hold true. Mechanoreception is thought to start by triggering of mechanosensors in the cell wall and/or plasma membrane of the leaf cells, causing ion fluxes of Ca2+, Reactive Oxygen Species (ROS), and H−. These fluxes initiate signaling pathways which involve many plant hormones and rapid expression of genes that respond early to many plant stresses. These genes up-regulate the production of chemical defense molecules like glucosinolates, polyphenol anthocyanins and a suite of volatile compounds. The plant not only secretes these chemicals in the leaf that is being attacked, but also in other leaves on the plant. It is hypothesized that while there are other signals that inform the plant of herbivory, it is the mechanical vibrations that are eliciting the whole-plant response.
