= Bristle sensilla =

Class of sensory hairs

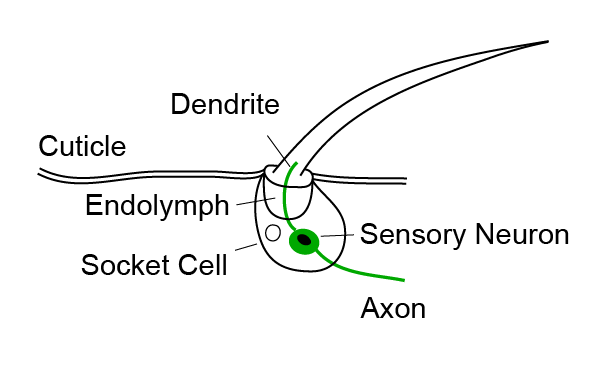
Schematic cross-section of an insect bristle sensillum. Each bristle is composed of a hair with its base fixed to the dendrite of a sensory neuron. The hair acts as a lever that exerts force on the dendrite, inducing mechanotransduction channels to open and producing electrical currents.

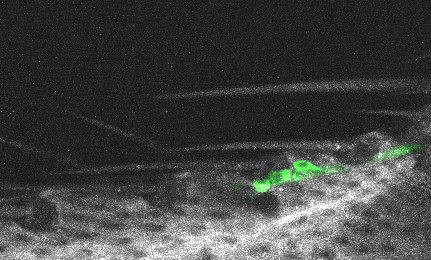
Bristle sensilla on the edge of a fruit fly wing. Green fluorescent labeling shows where sensory neurons innervate the bristles. In this image, some of the neurons are mechanosensory and some are gustatory.

Bristle sensilla are a class of mechanoreceptors found in insects and other arthropods that respond to mechanical stimuli generated by the external world. As a result, they are considered exteroceptors. Bristle sensilla can be divided into two main types, macrochaete and microchaete, based on their size and physiology. The larger macrochaete are thicker and stouter than the smaller microchaete. Macrochaete are also more consistent in their number and distribution across individuals of the same species. Between species, the organization of macrochaete is more conserved among closely related species, whereas the organization of microchaete is more variable and less correlated with phylogenetic relatedness.

Each bristle sensillum is composed of a hollow hair with its base fixed to the dendrite of a sensory neuron. The hair acts as a lever. When the hair is deflected, for example by dirt or parasites, force is exerted on the dendrite. This induces mechanotransduction channels to open, producing an electrical signal that is carried along an axon to the central nervous system.

Bristles are directionally selective to mechanical deflection. Fly bristles are typically angled 45° relative to the cuticle, and most bristle neurons are most sensitive to forces that push the bristle toward the cuticle. Movement of even a single bristle is sufficient to trigger an insect to groom.

== Bristle neurons ==
=== Morphology ===
Bristle neurons generally refers to the mechanosensory neurons that can be found at the base of each bristle sensilla. The cell body is located at the base with a dendrite extending far enough into the hair that deflection of the hair will open mechanotransduction channels and produce electrical currents. While the cell body and dendrite are located peripherally, the axon of bristle neurons project to either the brain or the ventral nerve cord (VNC) of the animal - a correlate to the mammalian spinal cord. Axons from bristle sensilla on the head terminate in the subesophageal zone (SEZ) in the brain, whereas bristle neurons from the legs, thorax and abdomen project to and terminate in the ventral surface of the VNC. It is thought that in both the SEZ and the VNC that the spatial organization of these axons represents a somatotopic map of different body segments.

Bristle neurons are also found at the base of chemosensory sensilla. These hairs tend to be longer with a distinct curve to their shape, they also contain a pore at the very tip that is used to sense various chemical signals. Instead of just a single mechanosensory neuron at the base of these hairs, they contain the mechanosensory neuron along with 2-4 gustatory receptor neurons. While gustatory and mechanosensory neurons project to different regions in the SEZ and VNC, it is still unclear which neuropil the mechanosensory neurons at the chemosensory sensilla project to.

=== Behavioral responses ===
Stimulation of bristle neurons along the body elicit a range of behavioral responses across many invertebrate species. In flies, stimulation of bristle hairs along the body may result in targeted grooming, walking, kicking, jumping or flying away. This variability in behavior is dependent on where on the body the bristles are, the number of bristles activated, how long the bristles are deflected along with many other spatial and temporal factors that are less understood.

If a single or few bristle neurons are activated on the leg by mechanical deflection or optogenetic activation, the fly will usually reach for that area of the leg and begin grooming its legs. However, similarly targeted stimulation of bristles hairs on the wing was more likely to result in a kicking behavior. It is thought that this spatial difference in behavior was due to wing stimulation mimicking the invading presence of mites.

Patches of bristle neuron activation on the leg through optogenetic activation result in a broad range of behaviors such as grooming, walking, or general leg movement. Which behavior was elicited was largely dependent on which segment and how many bristle neurons were activated.

Finally, if a fly is completely covered in dust (so all bristles are deflected), the fly will initiate a stereotyped grooming sequence to clean off the dust beginning at its head and ending with its legs. Interestingly, as long as there is dust on a particular body segment, such as its head, the fly will not continue on to the next segment in the sequence. This stereotyped grooming behavior is also seen in response to broad optogenetic activation of bristle neurons all over the body.

=== Physiology ===
Upon mechanical stimulation, bristle neurons elicit strong spiking responses. This has been characterized previously with extracellular recordings of individual bristle neurons in the fly in response to mechanical and optogenetic stimulation. Besides direction selectivity, it is thought that bristle neurons can be categorized into two physiological types: rapidly adapting and slow adapting. While these two classes exist across insects, the density of distribution of these cells varies by species. For example in the Locust, slow adapting bristles are more numerous and present all along the leg whereas rapidly adapting bristles are limited to the tibia. Furthermore, these categories exhibit different mechanical thresholds - slow adapting neurons respond to a lower threshold of about 10 degrees displacement, while rapidly adapting flies have a higher mechanical threshold at about 40 degrees. Similar findings have been observed in cockroaches and crickets. On the other hand, only slow adapting bristles have been observed in flies with an exceedingly low threshold of only 1 degree. It is still unclear whether they also possess rapidly adapting bristles.
