= Merkel nerve ending =

Pressure receptor of the skin

Merkel nerve endings (also Merkel's discs, or Merkel tactile endings) are mechanoreceptors situated in the basal epidermis as well as around the apical ends or some hair follicles. They are slowly adapting. They have small receptive fields measuring some millimeters in diameter. Most are associated with fast-conducting large myelinated axons. A single afferent nerve fibre branches to innervate up to 90 such endings. Merkel nerve endings respond to light touch. They respond to sustained pressure, and are sensitive to edges of objects. Their exact functions remain controversial.

The Merkel nerve endings consist of a nerve ending associated with a flattened epithelial cell (Merkel cell); both the nerve ending and Merkel cell are independently mechanosensitive. The Merkel cell expresses the PIEZO2 mechanosensitive ion channels; mechanical activation of the channel causes depolarisation of the Merkel cell and consequent release of serotonin into a synapse with the associated nerve ending, to also depolarise the later. The nerve ending, meanwhile, expresses an unknown mechanosensitive channel.

== Location ==
Merkel nerve endings have a widely distributed in glabrous and hairy skin, in hair follicles, and in oral and anal mucosa.

Merkel nerve endings are most numerous beneath the ridges of the fingertips which make up fingerprints, and less so in the palms and forearm.

They can be found at a depth of 900 μm in human fingertips.

In hairy skin, Merkel nerve endings are clustered into specialized epithelial structures called "touch domes" or "hair disks". Merkel receptors are also located in the mammary glands. Wherever they are found, the epithelium is arranged to optimize the transfer of pressure to the ending.

== Functions ==
Merkel nerve endings provide information on pressure, position, and deep static touch features such as shapes and edges. They are tactile sensors in the business of mechanotransduction. They encode surface features of touched objects into perception, but also have to do with proprioception.

=== Electrophysiology ===
The Merkel cell's somewhat rigid structure, and the fact that they are not encapsulated, causes them respond to a sustained adequate mechanical stimulus with sustained "firing" of action potentials (or spikes): they are slowly adapting (contrast with the rapidly adapting Pacinian and Meissner's corpuscles).

Merkel nerve endings exhibit an initial dynamic vigorous response to sustained mechanical stimulus, with a subsequent the static plateau phase of continuous lower-rate firing that may persist for more than 30 minutes. The inter-spike intervals during sustained firing are irregular, in contrast to the highly regular pattern of inter-spike intervals obtained from slowly adapting type II mechanoreceptors. They fire fastest, when small points indent the skin, and fire at a low rate on slow curves or flat surfaces. Convexities reduce their rate of firing further still.

=== Sensitivity and receptive fields ===
Merkel nerve endings are the most sensitive of the four main types of mechanoreceptors to vibrations at low frequencies, around 5 to 15 Hz. Merkel nerve endings are extremely sensitive to tissue displacement, and may respond to displacements of less than 1 μm. A mechanoreceptor's receptive field is the area within which a stimulus can excite the cell. If the skin is touched in two separate points within a single receptive field, the person will be unable to feel the two separate points. If the two points touched span more than a single receptive field then both will be felt. The size of mechanoreceptors' receptive fields in a given area determines the degree to which detailed stimuli can be resolved: the smaller and more densely clustered the receptive fields, the higher the resolution.

Type I afferent fibres have smaller receptive fields than type II fibres. Several studies indicate that type I fibres mediate high resolution tactile discrimination, and are responsible for the ability of our finger tips to feel fine detailed surface patterns (e.g. for reading Braille). Merkel's discs have small receptive fields which allow for them to detect fine spatial separation. They also have two point discrimination.

== Eponym ==
Merkel's discs are named after German anatomist Friedrich Merkel (1845–1919), who was 30 years old when he described them.

== Diseases ==
Merkel endings are the first to be obliterated in burns.
