= Vibratese =

Method of communication through vibration

Vibratese is a system of information transmission based on time and intensity modulated signals. The first Vibratese devices, developed by F. A. Geldard in 1957, were constructed of five vibrating modules attached to the interpreter's chest. Each vibrator was responsible for a different segment of the script, with the duration and intensity of the vibration corresponding to a particular symbol.

Vibratese was initially developed as a potential avenue to transmit intelligence to military targets in compromising environments. While not touched upon in Geldard's first paper, its potential application for the deaf and visually impaired was understood.

Geldard identified three tactile dimensions that could be easily and quickly discerned by an interpreter: duration, intensity, and location. Morse code is an example of an auditory system which transmits information modulated by duration alone, and can be used in a tactile device. Geldard found that utilizing all of these dimensions, instead of just one, allowed for higher information transmission rates. Several device configurations were identified as possible, including a seven point arrangement, but five was deemed sufficient. Geldard determined that three durations of signal (100 ms, 300 ms, 500 ms), and three intensities of vibration per vibrator was a viable system, and allowed for 45 symbols to be encoded using the five vibrators. Individual symbols were spaced 50 ms apart with a 100 ms pause between words. This allowed for a theoretical maximum transmission rate of 67 words per minute, versus Morse code with about 30.

To prevent ambiguity each vowel character was assigned to a separate vibrating module. To improve speed, numerals were assigned to the longest duration signals and the remaining letters were assigned according to frequency. Several of the symbol slots were assigned to common English words.

Vibratese symbol arrangement
Location	Duration	Intensity	Symbol
Upper left	short	high	O
Upper left	medium	high	B
Upper left	long	high	8
Upper left	short	medium	S
Upper left	medium	medium	of
Upper left	long	medium	
Upper left	short	low	L
Upper left	medium	low	K
Upper left	long	low	7
Upper right	short	high	E
Upper right	medium	high	J
Upper right	long	high	2
Upper right	short	medium	P
Upper right	medium	medium	the
Upper right	long	medium	
Upper right	short	low	T
Upper right	medium	low	V
Upper right	long	low	1
Middle	short	high	V
Middle	medium	high	Z
Middle	long	high	6
Middle	short	medium	F
Middle	medium	medium	X
Middle	long	medium	
Middle	short	low	H
Middle	medium	low	Q
Middle	long	low	5
Lower left	short	high	I
Lower left	medium	high	G
Lower left	long	high	0
Lower left	short	medium	C
Lower left	medium	medium	in
Lower left	long	medium	
Lower left	short	low	R
Lower left	medium	low	W
Lower left	long	low	9
Lower right	short	high	A
Lower right	medium	high	M
Lower right	long	high	4
Lower right	short	medium	D
Lower right	medium	medium	and
Lower right	long	medium	
Lower right	short	low	N
Lower right	medium	low	Y
Lower right	long	low	3

Several issues were identified with the system. The amount of training time required was seen as excessive. It was stated that 30 lessons, equated as hours, was required to learn the system. Additionally, ambiguity along the short-time intensity axis was an issue. A solution offered was to add an additional time duration, while decreasing the intensity axis. Additionally, Geldard proposed a potential system using closely spaced vibrators which could transmit focal movements, like the tracing of a finger, on the subject. Such a system could be used like a Lorm alphabet.
