= Hair plexus =

Sensory nerve fiber

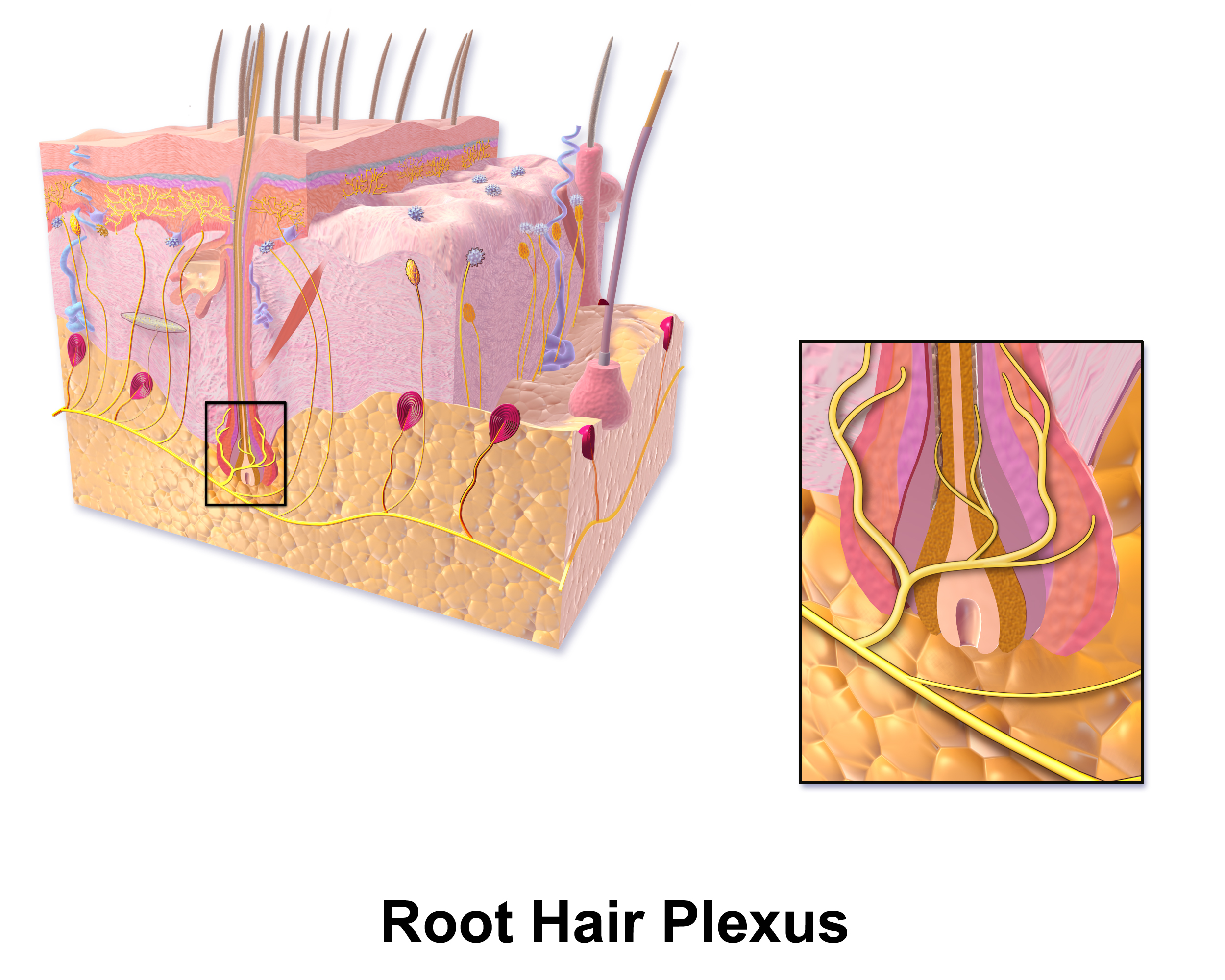
Hair plexus.

A hair plexus or root hair plexus is a special group of nerve fiber endings and serves as a very sensitive mechanoreceptor for touch sensation.

Hair contains a number of different types of nerve endings. They are specialized for the detection of different kinds of stimuli and thus different types of neuron innervate these structures within the skin. In particular there are neurons innervating the hair that detect deflection of the hair (i.e. to detect stroking), and pulling of the hair (i.e. noxious stimuli).

The hair follicles are innervated by at least 5 classes of low threshold mechanical receptors.

They are mechanoreceptors conveying touch sensation with cell bodies located inside of either dorsal root ganglia or trigeminal root ganglia. For most of the body (excluding the head and neck), crude touch and noxious stimuli from these receptors are further conveyed by the spinothalamic tract whereas discriminative and light touch are conveyed to via the dorsal column medial lemniscus pathway. The head and neck use pathways involving the spinal trigeminal nucleus.
