= Mechanoreceptor =

Sensory receptor cell responding to mechanical pressure or strain

A mechanoreceptor, also called mechanoceptor, is a sensory receptor that responds to mechanical pressure or distortion. Mechanoreceptors are located on sensory neurons that convert mechanical pressure into electrical signals that, in animals, are sent to the central nervous system.

== Vertebrate mechanoreceptors ==
=== Cutaneous mechanoreceptors ===
Cutaneous mechanoreceptors respond to mechanical stimuli that result from physical interaction, including pressure and vibration. They are located in the skin, like other cutaneous receptors. They are all innervated by Aβ fibers, except the mechanorecepting free nerve endings, which are innervated by Aδ fibers. Cutaneous mechanoreceptors can be categorized by what kind of sensation they perceive, by the rate of adaptation, and by morphology. Furthermore, each has a different receptive field.

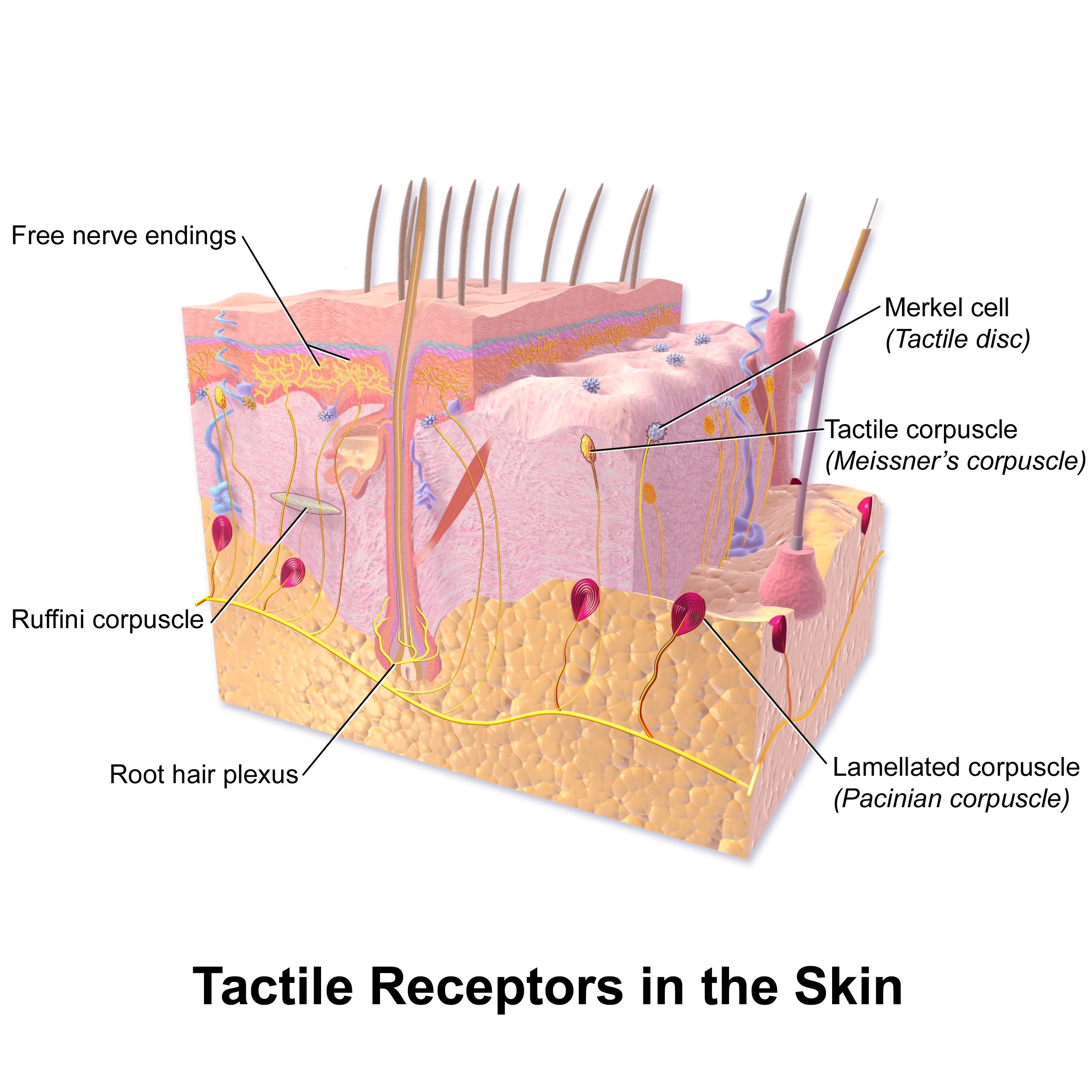
Tactile receptors.

==== By sensation ====
- The slowly adapting type 1 (SA1) mechanoreceptor, with the Merkel corpuscle end-organ (also known as Merkel discs), detects sustained pressure and underlies the perception of form and roughness on the skin. They have small receptive fields and produce sustained responses to static stimulation.
- The slowly adapting type 2 (SA2) mechanoreceptor, with the Ruffini corpuscle end-organ (also known as the bulbous corpuscle), detects tension deep in the skin and fascia and responds to skin stretch but has not been closely linked to either proprioceptive or mechanoreceptive roles in perception. They also produce sustained responses to static stimulation, but have large receptive fields.
- The rapidly adapting (RA) mechanoreceptor, with the Meissner corpuscle end-organ (also known as the tactile corpuscle), underlies the perception of light touch such as flutter and slip on the skin. It adapts rapidly to changes in texture (vibrations around 50 Hz). It has a small receptive field and produces transient responses to the onset and offset of stimulation.
- The lamellar corpuscle, also known as the Pacinian and Vater–Pacini corpuscle, in the skin and fascia detects rapid vibrations of about 200–300 Hz. It also produces transient responses but has a large receptive field.
- A free nerve ending detects touch, pressure, stretching, and the tickle and itch sensations. Itch is caused by stimulation of free nerve endings by chemicals.
- A hair follicle receptor, or hair root plexus, senses when a hair changes position. Indeed, the most sensitive mechanoreceptors in humans are
- A hair cell, in the cochlea of the inner ear (no relation to the follicular receptors – they are named for the hair-like mechanosensory stereocilia they possess) detects sound-frequency vibrations, in a range of roughly 20–20000 Hz, for hearing.

==== By rate of adaptation ====
Cutaneous mechanoreceptors can also be separated into categories based on their rates of adaptation. When a mechanoreceptor receives a stimulus, it begins to fire impulses or action potentials at an elevated frequency (the stronger the stimulus, the higher the frequency). The cell, however, will soon "adapt" to a constant or static stimulus, and the pulses will subside to a normal rate. Receptors that adapt quickly (i.e., quickly return to a normal pulse rate) are referred to as "phasic". Those receptors that are slow to return to their normal firing rate are called tonic. Phasic mechanoreceptors are useful in sensing such things as texture or vibrations, whereas tonic receptors are useful for temperature and proprioception among others.

- Slowly adapting: Slowly adapting mechanoreceptors include Merkel and Ruffini corpuscle end-organs, and some free nerve endings.
  - Slowly adapting type I mechanoreceptors have multiple Merkel corpuscle end-organs.
  - Slowly adapting type II mechanoreceptors have single Ruffini corpuscle end-organs.
- Intermediate adapting: Some free nerve endings are intermediate adapting.
- Rapidly adapting: Rapidly adapting mechanoreceptors include Meissner corpuscle end-organs, Pacinian corpuscle end-organs, hair follicle receptors and some free nerve endings.
  - Rapidly adapting type I mechanoreceptors have multiple Meissner corpuscle end-organs.
  - Rapidly adapting type II mechanoreceptors (usually called Pacinian) have single Pacinian corpuscle end-organs.

==== By receptive field ====
Cutaneous mechanoreceptors with small, accurate receptive fields are found in areas needing accurate taction (e.g. the fingertips). In the fingertips and lips, innervation density of slowly adapting type I and rapidly adapting type I mechanoreceptors are greatly increased. These two types of mechanoreceptors have small discrete receptive fields and are thought to underlie most low-threshold use of the fingers in assessing texture, surface slip, and flutter. Mechanoreceptors found in areas of the body with less tactile acuity tend to have larger receptive fields.

=== Lamellar corpuscles ===
Lamellar corpuscles, or Pacinian corpuscles or Vater–Pacini corpuscles, are deformation, or pressure, receptors located in the skin and also in various internal organs. Each is connected to a sensory neuron. Because of its relatively large size, a single lamellar corpuscle can be isolated and its properties studied. Mechanical pressure of varying strength and frequency can be applied to the corpuscle by stylus, and the resulting electrical activity detected by electrodes attached to the preparation.

Deforming the corpuscle creates a generator potential in the sensory neuron arising within it. This is a graded response: the greater the deformation, the greater the generator potential. If the generator potential reaches threshold, a volley of action potentials (nerve impulses) are triggered at the first node of Ranvier of the sensory neuron.

Once threshold is reached, the magnitude of the stimulus is encoded in the frequency of impulses generated in the neuron. So the more massive or rapid the deformation of a single corpuscle, the higher the frequency of nerve impulses generated in its neuron.

The optimal sensitivity of a lamellar corpuscle is 250 Hz, the frequency range generated upon finger tips by textures made of features smaller than 200 micrometres.

=== Ligamentous mechanoreceptors ===
There are four types of mechanoreceptors embedded in ligaments. As all these types of mechanoreceptors are myelinated, they can rapidly transmit sensory information regarding joint positions to the central nervous system.

- Type I: (small) Low threshold, slow adapting in both static and dynamic settings
- Type II: (medium) Low threshold, rapidly adapting in dynamic settings
- Type III: (large) High threshold, slowly adapting in dynamic settings
- Type IV: (very small) High threshold pain receptors that communicate injury

Type II and Type III mechanoreceptors in particular are believed to be linked to one's sense of proprioception.

=== Other mechanoreceptors ===
Other mechanoreceptors than cutaneous ones include the hair cells, which are sensory receptors in the vestibular system of the inner ear, where they contribute to the auditory system and equilibrioception. Baroreceptors are a type of mechanoreceptor sensory neuron that is excited by stretch of the blood vessel. There are also juxtacapillary (J) receptors, which respond to events such as pulmonary edema, pulmonary emboli, pneumonia, and barotrauma.

=== Muscle spindles and the stretch reflex ===
The knee jerk is the popularly known stretch reflex (involuntary kick of the lower leg) induced by tapping the knee with a rubber-headed hammer. The hammer strikes a tendon that inserts an extensor muscle in the front of the thigh into the lower leg. Tapping the tendon stretches the thigh muscle, which activates stretch receptors within the muscle called muscle spindles. Each muscle spindle consists of sensory nerve endings wrapped around special muscle fibers called intrafusal muscle fibers. Stretching an intrafusal fiber initiates a volley of impulses in the sensory neuron (a I-a neuron) attached to it. The impulses travel along the sensory axon to the spinal cord where they form several kinds of synapses:

1. Some of the branches of the I-a axons synapse directly with alpha motor neurons. These carry impulses back to the same muscle causing it to contract. The leg straightens.
2. Some of the branches of the I-a axons synapse with inhibitory interneurons in the spinal cord. These, in turn, synapse with motor neurons leading back to the antagonistic muscle, a flexor in the back of the thigh. By inhibiting the flexor, these interneurons aid contraction of the extensor.
3. Still other branches of the I-a axons synapse with interneurons leading to brain centers, e.g., the cerebellum, that coordinate body movements.

=== Mechanism of sensation ===
In somatosensory transduction, the afferent neurons transmit messages through synapses in the dorsal column nuclei, where second-order neurons send the signal to the thalamus and synapse with third-order neurons in the ventrobasal complex. The third-order neurons then send the signal to the somatosensory cortex.

More recent work has expanded the role of the cutaneous mechanoreceptors for feedback in fine motor control. Single action potentials from Meissner's corpuscle, Pacinian corpuscle and Ruffini ending afferents are directly linked to muscle activation, whereas Merkel cell-neurite complex activation does not trigger muscle activity.

== Invertebrate mechanoreceptors ==
Insect and arthropod mechanoreceptors include:

- Campaniform sensilla: Small domes in the exoskeleton that are distributed all along the insect's body. These cells are thought to detect mechanical load as resistance to muscle contraction, similar to the mammalian Golgi tendon organs.
- Hair plates: Sensory neurons that innervate hairs that are found in the folds of insect joints. These hairs are deflected when one body segment moves relative to an adjoining segment, they have proprioceptive function, and are thought to act as limit detectors encoding the extreme ranges of motion for each joint.
- Chordotonal organs: Internal stretch receptors at the joints, can have both extero- and proprioceptive functions. The neurons in the chordotonal organ in Drosophila melanogaster can be organized into club, claw, and hook neurons. Club neurons are thought to encode vibrational signals while claw and hook neurons can be subdivided into extension and flexion populations that encode joint angle and movement respectively.
- Slit sensilla: Slits in the exoskeleton that detect physical deformation of the animal's exoskeleton, have proprioceptive function.
- Bristle sensilla: Bristle neurons are mechanoreceptors that innervate hairs all along the body. Each neuron extends a dendritic process to innervate a single hair and projects its axon to the ventral nerve cord. These neurons are thought to mediate touch sensation by responding to physical deflections of the hair. In line with the fact that many insects exhibit different sized hairs, commonly referred to as macrochaetes (thicker longer hairs) and microchaetes (thinner shorter hairs), previous studies suggest that bristle neurons to these different hairs may have different firing properties such as resting membrane potential and firing threshold.

== Plant mechanoreceptors ==
Mechanoreceptors are also present in plant cells where they play an important role in normal growth, development and the sensing of their environment. Mechanoreceptors aid the Venus flytrap (Dionaea muscipula Ellis) in capturing large prey.

== Molecular biology ==
Mechanoreceptor proteins are ion channels whose ion flow is induced by touch. Early research showed that touch transduction in the nematode Caenorhabditis elegans was found to require a two transmembrane, amiloride-sensitive ion channel protein related to epithelial sodium channels (ENaCs). This protein, called MEC-4, forms a heteromeric Na^{+}-selective channel together with MEC-10. Related genes in mammals are expressed in sensory neurons and were shown to be gated by low pH. The first of such receptor was ASIC1a, named so because it is an acid sensing ion channel (ASIC).

== See also ==
- Somatosensory system
- Thermoreceptor
- Nociceptor
- Stretch sensor
- Vestibular system
- Stretch receptor
