= Thermoreceptor =

Receptive portion of a sensory neuron

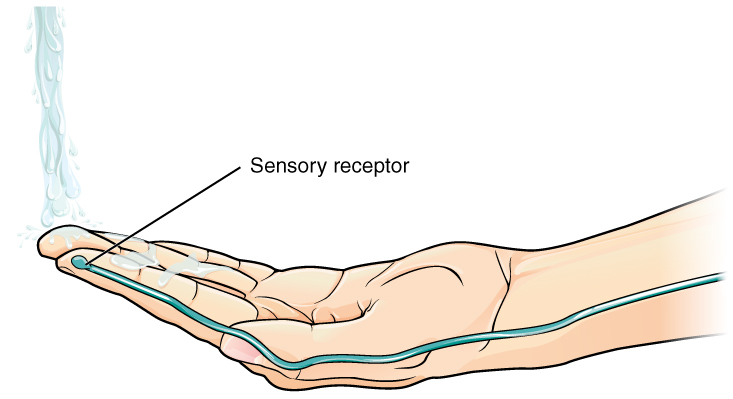
Thermoreceptors of the skin sense the temperature of water

A thermoreceptor is a non-specialised sense receptor, or more accurately the receptive portion of a sensory neuron, that codes absolute and relative changes in temperature, primarily within the innocuous range. In the mammalian peripheral nervous system, warmth receptors are thought to be unmyelinated C-fibres (low conduction velocity), while those responding to cold have both C-fibers and thinly myelinated A delta fibers (faster conduction velocity). The adequate stimulus for a warm receptor is warming, which results in an increase in their action potential discharge rate. Cooling results in a decrease in warm receptor discharge rate. For cold receptors their firing rate increases during cooling and decreases during warming. Some cold receptors also respond with a brief action potential discharge to high temperatures, i.e. typically above 45 °C, and this is known as a paradoxical response to heat. The mechanism responsible for this behavior has not been determined.

== Location ==
In humans, along the axons of Lissauer's tract temperature or pressure sensations enter the spinal cord. The Lissauer's tract will synapse on first-order neurons in grey matter of the dorsal horn, one or two vertebral levels up. The axons of these second-order neurons then decussate, joining the spinothalamic tract as they ascend to neurons in the ventral posterolateral nucleus of the thalamus.

In mammals, temperature receptors innervate various tissues including the skin (as cutaneous receptors), cornea and urinary bladder. Neurons from the pre-optic and hypothalamic regions of the brain that respond to small changes in temperature have also been described, providing information on core temperature. The hypothalamus is involved in thermoregulation, the thermoreceptors allowing feed-forward responses to a predicted change in core body temperature in response to changing environmental conditions.

== Structure ==
Thermoreceptors have been classically described as having free –non-specialized– endings. The mechanism of activation in response to temperature changes is not completely understood.

== Function ==
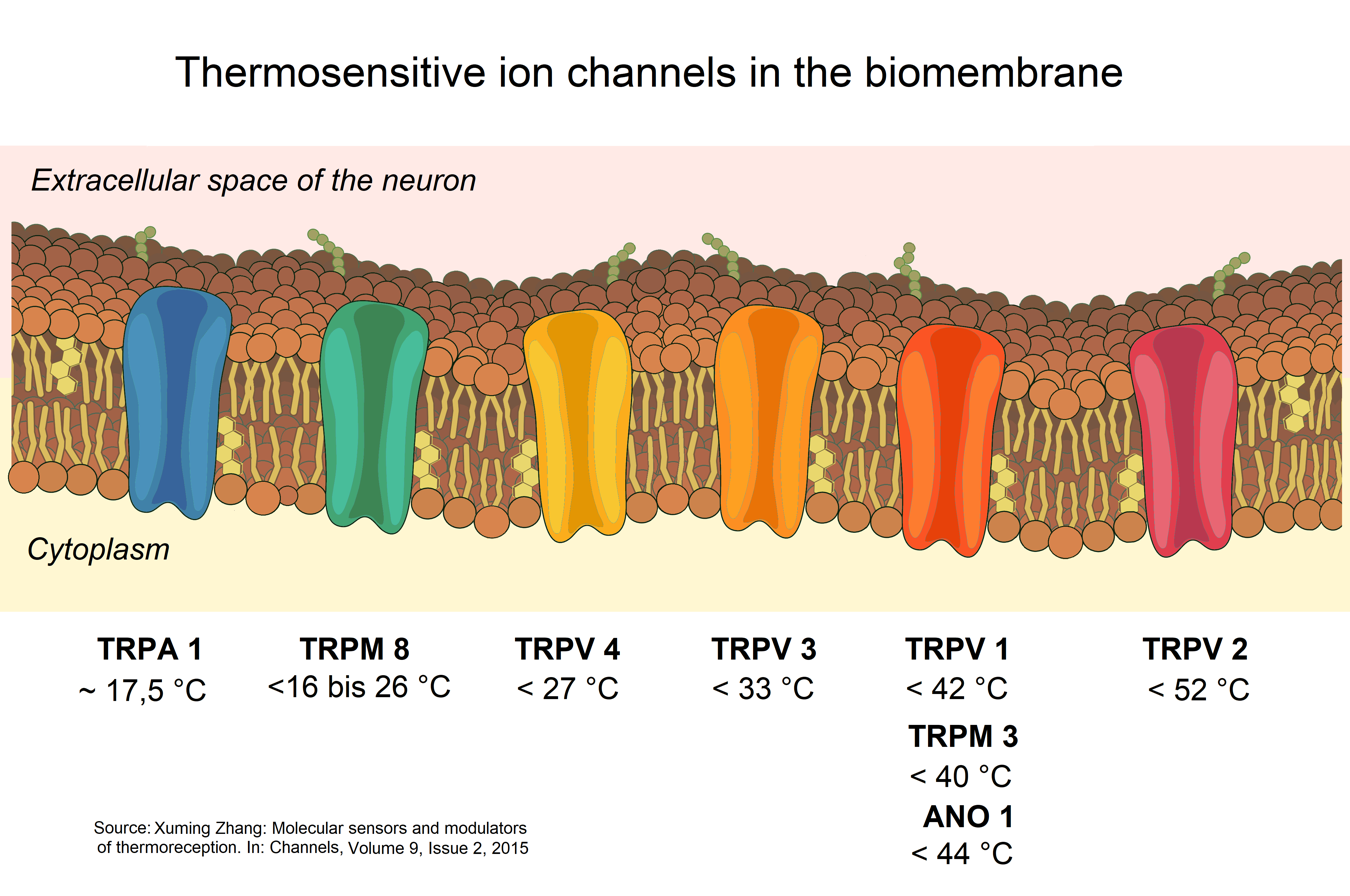
Channels shown: TRPA1, TRPM8, TRPV4, TRPV3, TRPV1, TRPM3, ANO1, TRPV2

Cold-sensitive thermoreceptors give rise to the sensations of cooling, cold and freshness. In the cornea cold receptors are thought to respond with an increase in firing rate to cooling produced by evaporation of lacrimal fluid 'tears' and thereby to elicit a blink reflex. Other thermoreceptors will react to opposite triggers and give rise to heat and in some cases even burning sensations. This is often experienced when coming in contact with capsaicin, an active chemical commonly found in chili peppers. When coming in contact with the tongue (or any internal surface), the capsaicin de-polarizes the nerve fibers, allowing sodium and calcium into the fibers. In order for fibers to do so, they must have a specific thermoreceptor. The thermoreceptor reacting to capsaicin and other heat producing chemicals is known as TRPV1. In response to heat, the TRPV1 receptor opens up passages that allow ions to pass through, causing the sensation of heat or burning. TRPV1 also has a molecular cousin, TRPM8. Unlike TRPV1, TRPM8 produces cooling sensations. Similar to TRPV1, TRPM8 responds to a certain chemical trigger by opening its ion pathways. In this case, the chemical trigger is often menthol or other cooling agents. Studies performed on mice determined that the presence of both these receptors allows for a gradient of temperature sensing. Mice lacking the TRPV1 receptor were still capable of determining areas significantly colder than on a heated platform. Mice lacking the TRPM8 receptor however, were not able to determine the difference between a warm platform and a cold platform, suggesting we rely on TRPM8 to determine cold feelings and sensations.

== Distribution ==
Warm and cold receptors play a part in sensing innocuous environmental temperature. Temperatures likely to damage an organism are sensed by sub-categories of nociceptors that may respond to noxious cold, noxious heat or more than one noxious stimulus modality (i.e., they are polymodal). The nerve endings of sensory neurons that respond preferentially to cooling are found in moderate density in the skin but also occur in relatively high spatial density in the cornea, tongue, bladder, and facial skin. The speculation is that lingual cold receptors deliver information that modulates the sense of taste; i.e. some foods taste good when cold, while others do not.

== Mechanism of transduction ==
This area of research has recently received considerable attention with the identification and cloning of the Transient Receptor Potential (TRP) family of proteins. The transduction of temperature in cold receptors is mediated in part by the TRPM8 channel. This channel passes a mixed inward cationic current (predominantly carried by Na^{+} ions although the channel is also permeable to Ca^{2+}) of a magnitude that is inversely proportional to temperature. The channel is sensitive over a temperature range spanning about 10-35 °C. TRPM8 can also be activated by the binding of an extracellular ligand. Menthol can activate the TRPM8 channel in this way. Since the TRPM8 is expressed in neurons whose physiological role is to signal cooling, menthol applied to various bodily surfaces evokes a sensation of cooling. The feeling of freshness associated with the activation of cold receptors by menthol, particularly those in facial areas with axons in the trigeminal (V) nerve, accounts for its use in numerous toiletries including toothpaste, shaving lotions, facial creams and the like.

Another molecular component of cold transduction is the temperature dependence of so-called leak channels which pass an outward current carried by potassium ions. Some leak channels derive from the family of two-pore (2P) domain potassium channels. Amongst the various members of the 2P-domain channels, some close quite promptly at temperatures less than about 28 °C (e.g. KCNK4(TRAAK), TREK). Temperature also modulates the activity of the Na^{+}/K^{+}-ATPase. The Na^{+}/K^{+}-ATPase is a P-type pump that extrudes 3Na^{+} ions in exchange for 2K^{+} ions for each hydrolytic cleavage of ATP. This results in a net movement of positive charge out of the cell, i.e. a hyperpolarizing current. The magnitude of this current is proportional to the rate of pump activity.

It has been suggested that it is the constellation of various thermally sensitive proteins together in a neuron that gives rise to a cold receptor. This emergent property of the neuron is thought to comprise, the expression of the aforementioned proteins as well as various voltage-sensitive channels including the hyperpolarization-activated, cyclic nucleotide-gated (HCN) channel and the rapidly activating and inactivating transient potassium channel (IK_{A}).
