= Pacinian corpuscle =

Type of mechanoreceptor cell in hairless mammals

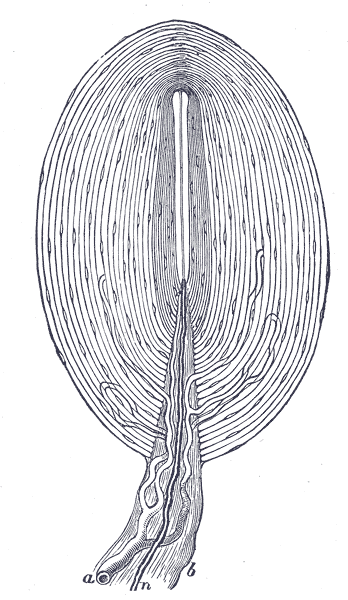
- Pacinian corpuscle, with its system of capsules and central cavity. a. Arterial twig, ending in capillaries, which form loops in some of the intercapsular spaces, and one penetrates to the central capsule. b. The fibrous tissue of the stalk. n. Nerve tube advancing to the central capsule, there losing its white matter and stretching along the axis to the opposite end, where it ends by a tuberculated enlargement.

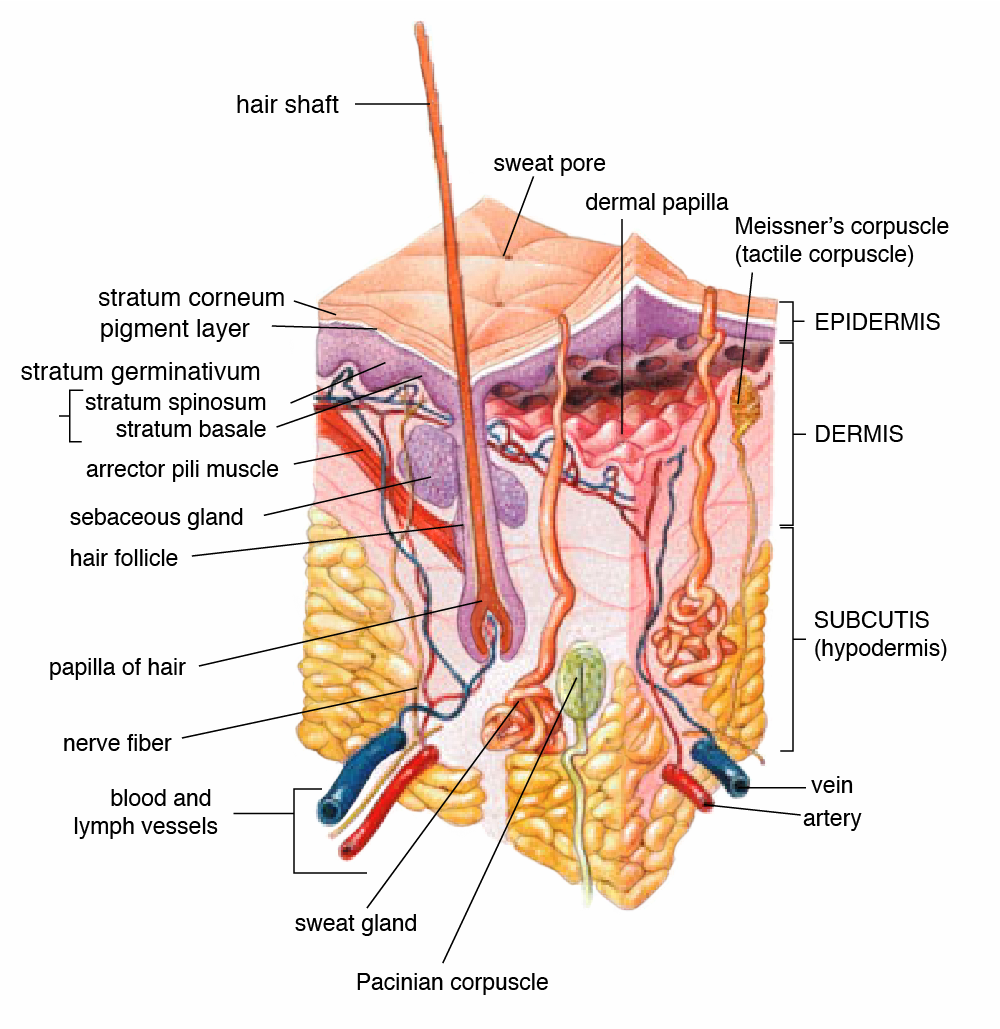
- Pacinian corpuscle labeled at bottom

Details
- Location: Skin

Identifiers
- Latin: corpusculum Pacinian
- MeSH: D010141
- TH: H3.11.06.0.00009
- FMA: 83604

The Pacinian corpuscle (also lamellar corpuscle, or Vater–Pacini corpuscle) is a low-threshold mechanoreceptor, responsive to deep pressure, stretch, tickle and vibration, found in the skin and other internal organs. In the skin it is one of the four main types of cutaneous receptors.

The corpuscles are present in skin notably on both surfaces of the hands and feet, arms, and neck. Pacinian corpuscles are also found on bone periosteum, joint capsules, the pancreas and other internal organs, the breast, genitals, and lymph nodes.

Pacinian corpuscles are rapidly adapting mechanoreceptors. As phasic receptors they respond quickly but briefly to a stimulus with the response diminishing even when the stimulus is maintained. They primarily respond to vibration, and deep pressure. They are especially sensitive to high-frequency vibrations. Groups of corpuscles sense pressure changes (such as on grasping or releasing an object). They are additionally crucially involved in proprioception. The vibrational role may be used for detecting surface texture, such as rough and smooth.

== Structure ==
Pacinian corpuscles are larger and fewer in number than Meissner's corpuscles, Merkel cells and Ruffini's corpuscles. They may measure up to 2 mm in length, and nearly 1 mm in diameter. They are oval, spherical, or irregularly coiled in shape. Larger ones are visible to the naked eye. They have large receptive fields - as large as half of the palm. In the skin, the corpuscles are situated deep within the dermis.

=== Axon terminal ===
Each corpuscle is associated with a myelinated axon; these are some of the largest and fastest-conducting sensory axons arising from the skin.

Towards the center of the corpuscle, the axon loses its sheaths, ending as with a slight bulge at the center of the corpuscle. This axon terminal issues brief projections of unknown functional significance into gaps between the surrounding innermost lamellae; large mitochondria and small vessels aggregate near these projections.

=== Capsule ===
The capsule consists of 20-70 concentrically-arranged connective tissue lamellae around the axon terminal at its center, forming a structure much like an onion. The capsule consists of fibroblasts and fibrous connective tissue (mainly Type IV and Type II collagen network), separated by gelatinous material, more than 92% of which is water. It presents a whorled pattern on micrographs.

If the corpuscle's capsule is experimentally removed, the divested axon terminal becomes slowly adapting. The capsule is therefore responsible for the corpuscle's selectivity for high-frequency stimuli. This is a result of the slippery lamellae sliding past each other when the corpuscle is structurally deformed by external pressure so that effects of sustained pressure are soon dissipated by the lamellae, abolishing deformation of the central axon terminal itself. The capsule thus acts as a physiological high-pass filter.

== Function ==
Pacinian corpuscles are rapidly adapting phasic receptors that detect gross pressure changes and vibrations in the skin. Pacinian corpuscles have a large receptive field on the skin's surface with an especially sensitive center.

The corpuscles are especially sensitive to vibrations, which they can sense even centimeters away. Their optimal sensitivity is 250 Hz, and this is the frequency range generated upon fingertips by textures made of features smaller than 1 μm. Pacinian corpuscles respond when the skin is rapidly indented but not when the pressure is steady (due to the capsule). It is thought that they respond to high-velocity changes in joint position. They have also been implicated in detecting the location of touch sensations on handheld tools.

=== Sensory transduction ===
Pacinian corpuscles sense stimuli due to the deformation of their lamellae in the capsule and inner core, which in turn press on the membrane (axolemma) of the sensory neuron and causes it to bend or stretch. The external stimulus (deformation of or force on the external surface of the capsule) reaches axolemma of the terminal neurite through a complex mechanical filtration process. The internal lamellar spacing, number of lamella present in the capsule and the biomechanical properties of lamellae and the interlamellar fluid governs the characteristics of this mechanical filter acting on the external stimulus. When the axolemma are deformed by the filtered stumulus, due to either application or release of the external stimulus, a generator or receptor potential is created as it physically deforms the plasma membrane of axon terminal, making it "leak" different cations through mechanosensitive channels which initiates the receptor potential. This initial receptor potential is potentiated by voltage-activated ion channels present in the inner-core of the corpuscle. Finally, the receptor potential is modulated to neural spikes or action potential with the help of opening of sodium ion channels present at the first Ranvier's Node of the axon.

Due to generation of receptor potential in the receptive area of the neurite (especially near the heminode or half-node of the axon) the potential at the first Ranvier's node can reach certain threshold, triggering nerve impulses or action potentials at the first node of Ranvier. The first Ranvier's node of the myelinated section of the neurite is often found inside the capsule. This impulse is then transferred along the axon from node to node with the use of sodium channels and sodium/potassium pumps in the axon membrane.

Once the receptive area of the neurite is depolarized, it will depolarize the first node of Ranvier; however, as it is a rapidly adapting fibre, this does not carry on indefinitely, and the signal propagation ceases. This is a graded response, meaning that the greater the deformation, the greater the generator potential. This information is encoded in the frequency of impulses, since a bigger or faster deformation induces a higher impulse frequency. Action potentials are formed when the skin is rapidly distorted but not when pressure is continuous because of the mechanical filtering of the stimulus in the lamellar structure. The frequencies of the impulses decrease quickly and soon stop due to the relaxation of the inner layers of connective tissue that cover the nerve ending.

=== Surface vibrations ===
The Pacinian corpuscles in elephant feet have been suggested to enable seismic communication. The Pacinian corpuscles in mice can detect taps on a branch 2.5 meters away.

== History ==
Pacinian corpuscles were the first cellular sensory receptor ever observed. They were first reported by German anatomist and botanist Abraham Vater and his student Johannes Gottlieb Lehmann in 1741, but ultimately named after Italian anatomist Filippo Pacini, who rediscovered them in 1835. John Shekleton, a curator of the Royal College of Surgeons in Ireland, also discovered them before Pacini, but his results were published later. Similar to Pacinian corpuscles, Herbst corpuscles and Grandry corpuscles are found in bird species.

== Additional images ==
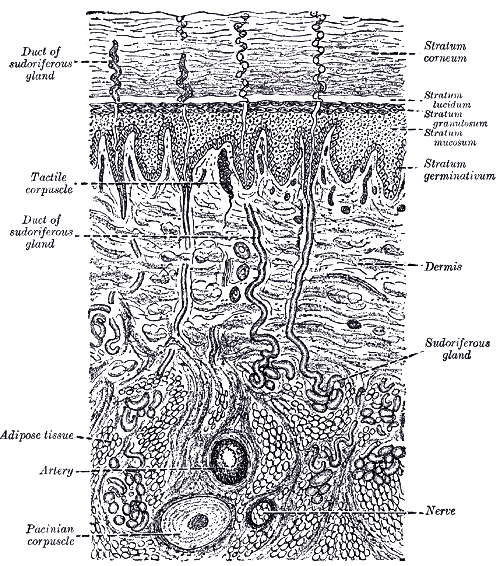
Diagrammatic sectional view of the skin (magnified)

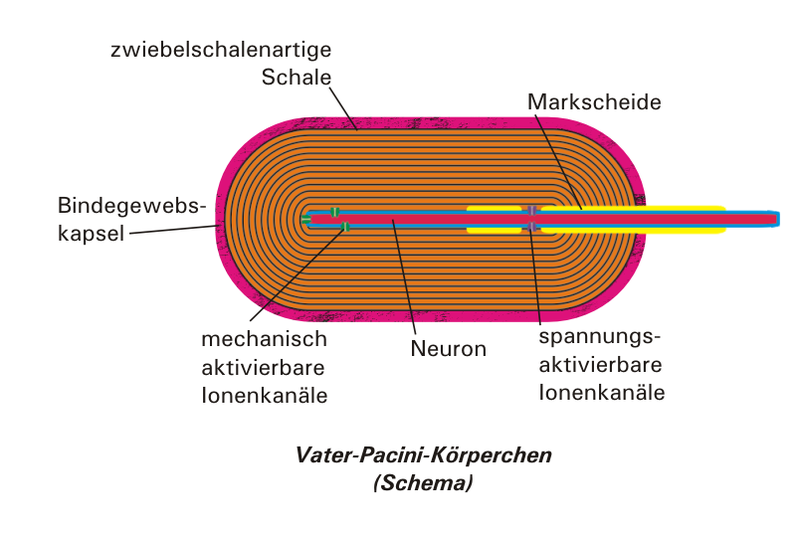
Schema (German)

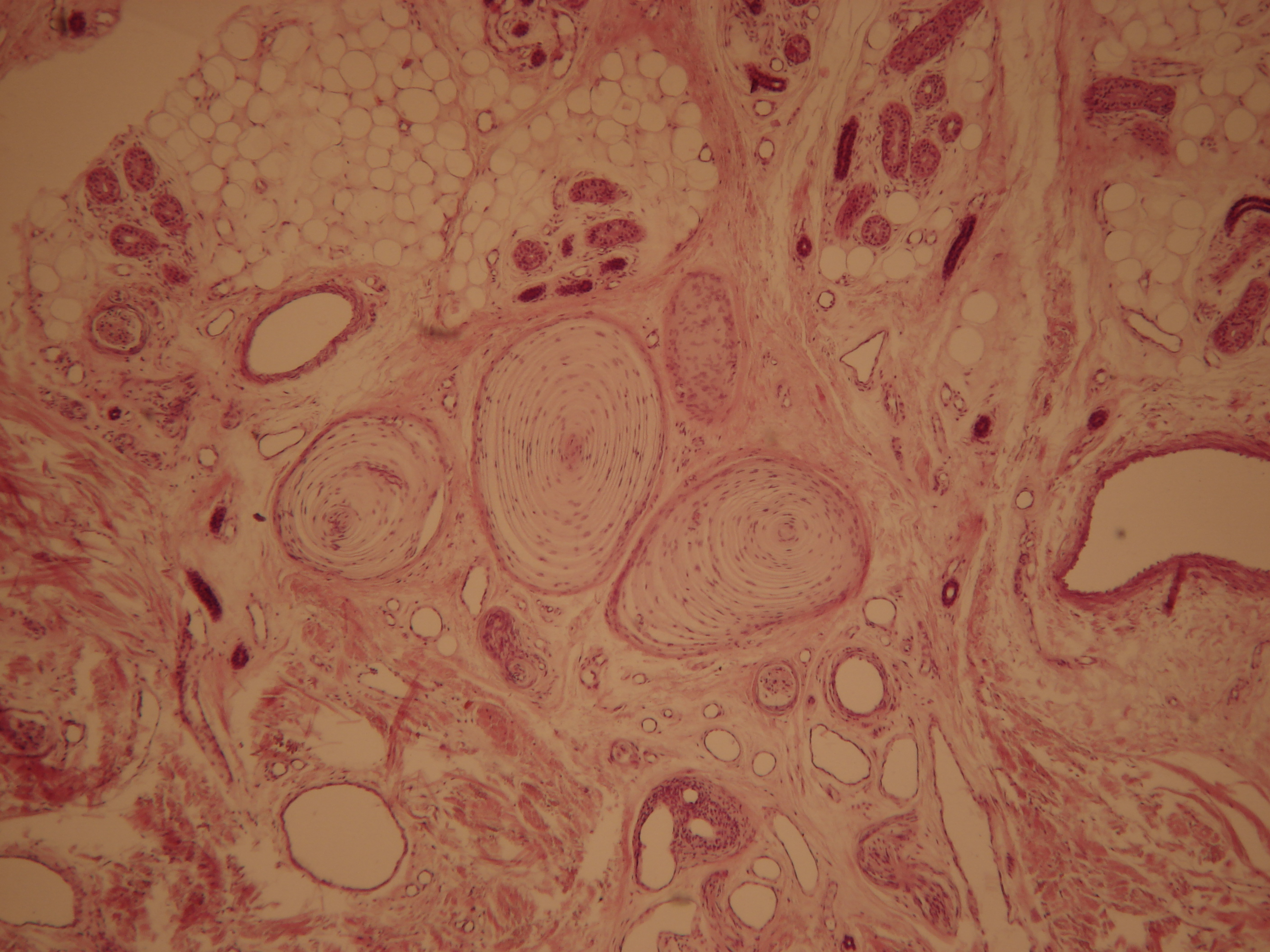
Light micrograph showing three corpuscles in the center of the field

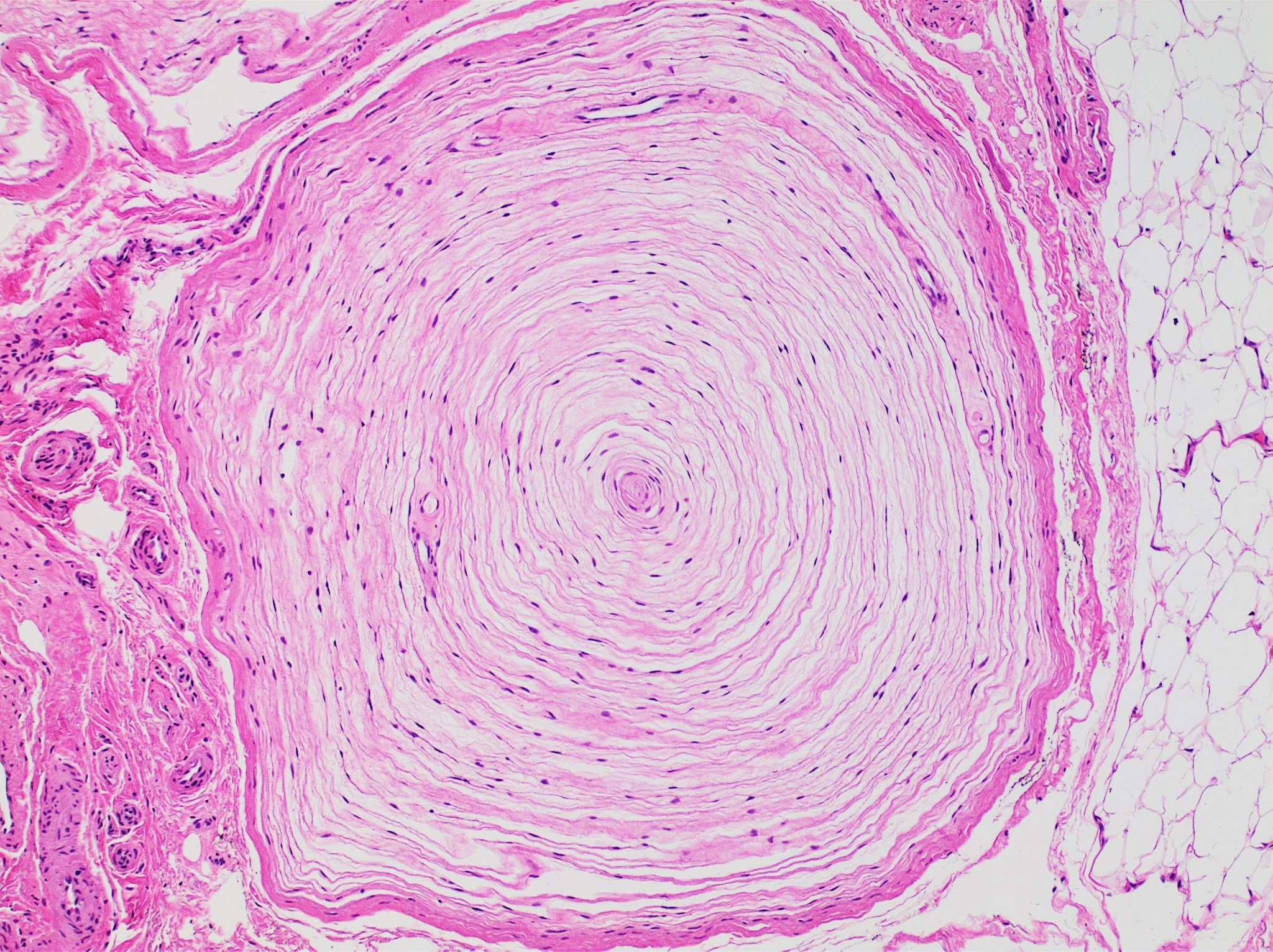
Micrograph of a Pacinian corpuscle

== See also ==
- Pallesthesia
- Pacinian neuroma – a very rare benign tumor of Pacinian corpuscles
- Rayleigh wave#Possible animal reaction
