= Tactile corpuscle =

Type of mechanoreceptor that detects light touch

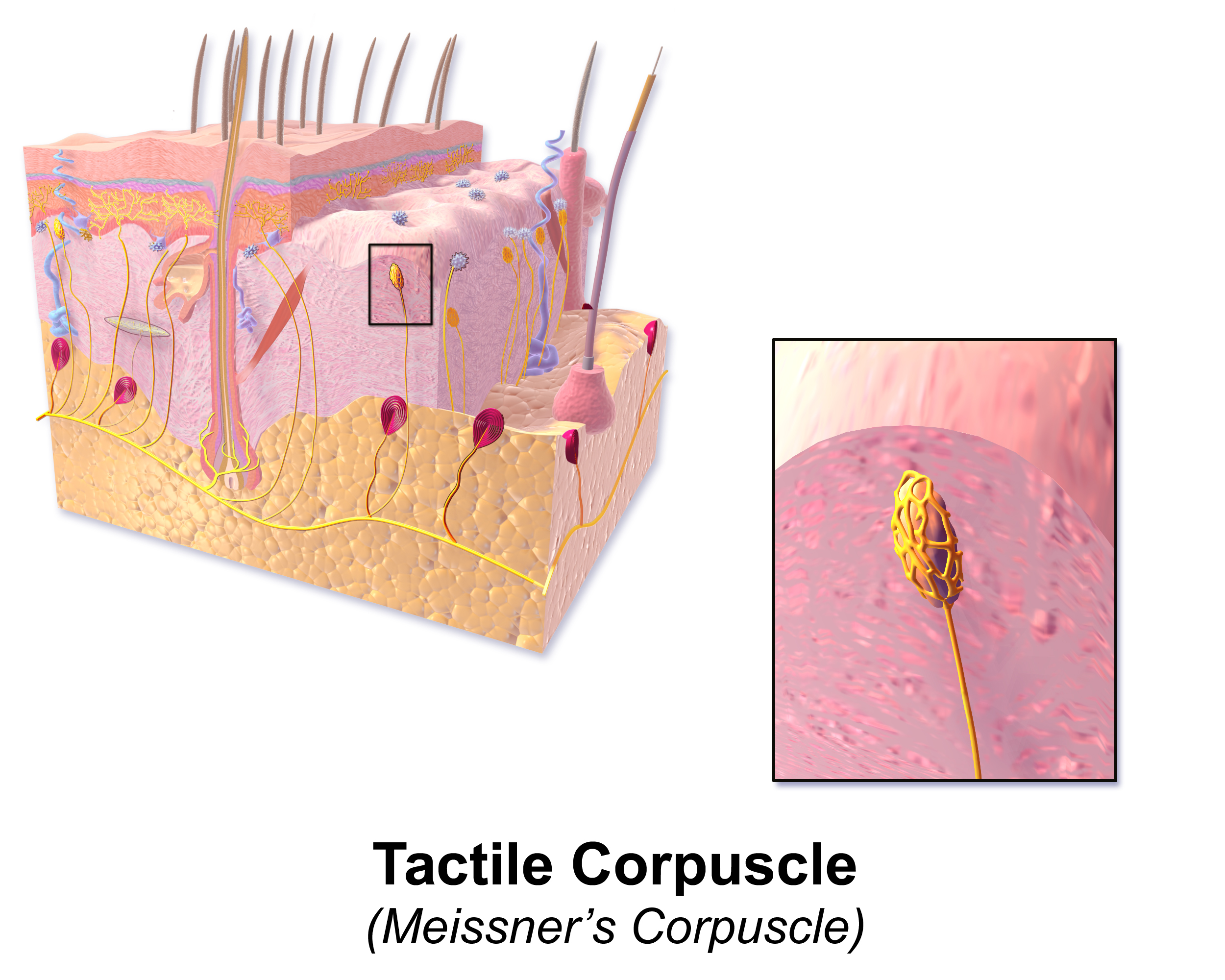

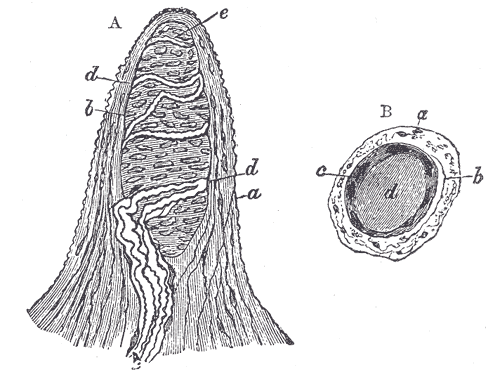
- Papilla of the hand, magnified 350 times.: 1. Side view of a papilla of the hand.; 1. Cortical layer.; 2. Tactile corpuscle.; 3. Small nerve of the papilla, with neurolemma.; 4. Its two nerve fibers (axons) running with spiral coils around the tactile corpuscle.; 5. Apparent termination of one of these fibers.; 2. A tactile papilla seen from above so as to show its transverse section.; 1. Cortical layer.; 2. Nerve fiber.; 3. Outer layer of the tactile body, with nuclei.; 4. Clear interior substance.

Details
- Location: Skin

Identifiers
- Latin: corpusculum tactus
- TH: H3.11.06.0.00007
- FMA: 83605

The tactile corpuscle, or Meissner's corpuscle, is a type of mechanoreceptor discovered by anatomist Georg Meissner (1829–1905) and Rudolf Wagner. This corpuscle is a type of nerve ending in the skin that is responsible for sensitivity to pressure. In particular, it has its highest sensitivity (lowest threshold) when sensing vibrations between 10 and 50 hertz. It is a rapidly adaptive receptor. They are most concentrated in thick hairless skin, especially at the finger pads.

== Structure ==
Tactile corpuscles are encapsulated myelinated nerve endings, surrounded by Schwann cells. The encapsulation consists of flattened supportive cells arranged as horizontal lamellae surrounded by a connective tissue capsule. The corpuscle is 30–140 μm in length and 40–60 μm in diameter. A single nerve fiber meanders between the lamellae and throughout the corpuscle.

=== Location ===
They are distributed on various areas of the skin, but concentrated in areas especially sensitive to light touch, such as the fingers, lips and male prepuce. More specifically, they are primarily located in glabrous skin just beneath the epidermis within the dermal papillae.

=== Comparison with other receptors ===
Feelings of deep pressure (from a poke, for instance) are generated from lamellar corpuscles (the only other type of phasic tactile mechanoreceptor), which are located deeper in the dermis, and some free nerve endings.

Also, tactile corpuscles do not detect noxious stimuli; this is signaled exclusively by free nerve endings.

== Development ==
The number of tactile corpuscles per square millimeter of human skin on the fingertips drops fourfold between the ages of 12 and 50. The rate at which they are lost correlates well with the age-related loss in touch sensitivity for small probes.

== Function ==
Tactile corpuscles are rapidly adapting mechanoreceptors. They are sensitive to shape and textural changes in exploratory and discriminatory touch. Their acute sensitivity provides the neural basis for reading Braille text. Because of their superficial location in the dermis, these corpuscles are particularly sensitive to touch and vibrations, but for the same reasons, they are limited in their detection because they can only signal that something is touching the skin. They also contribute to two-point discrimination, allowing the skin to detect stimuli at closely spaced points.

Any physical deformation of the corpuscle will cause sodium ions to enter it, creating an action potential in the corpuscle's nerve fiber. Since they are rapidly adapting or phasic, the action potentials generated quickly decrease and eventually cease (this is the reason one stops "feeling" one's clothes).

If the stimulus is removed, the corpuscle regains its shape and while doing so (i.e.: while physically reforming) causes another volley of action potentials to be generated.

== Additional images ==
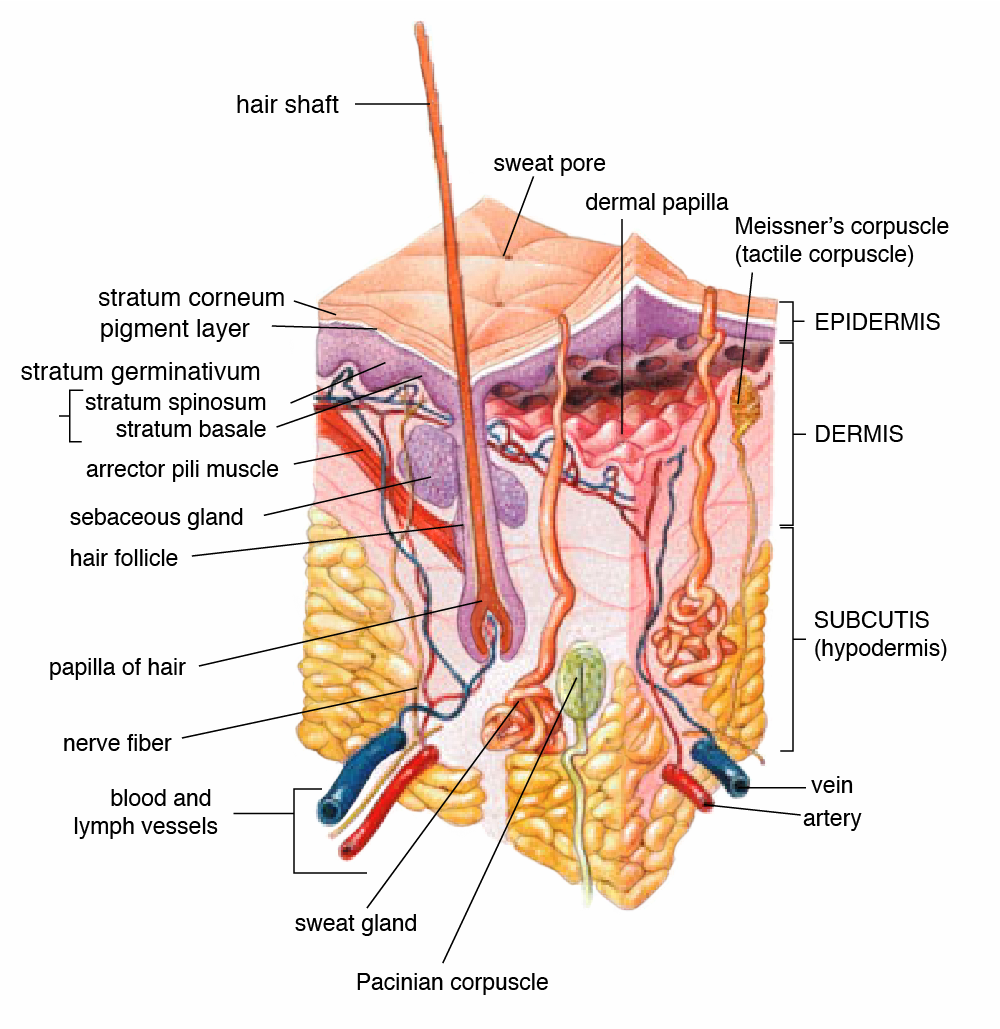
"Meissner's corpuscle" labeled at upper right

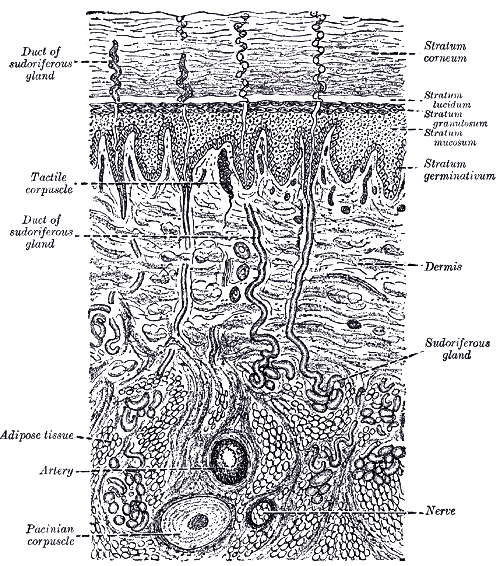
Diagrammatic sectional view of the skin.

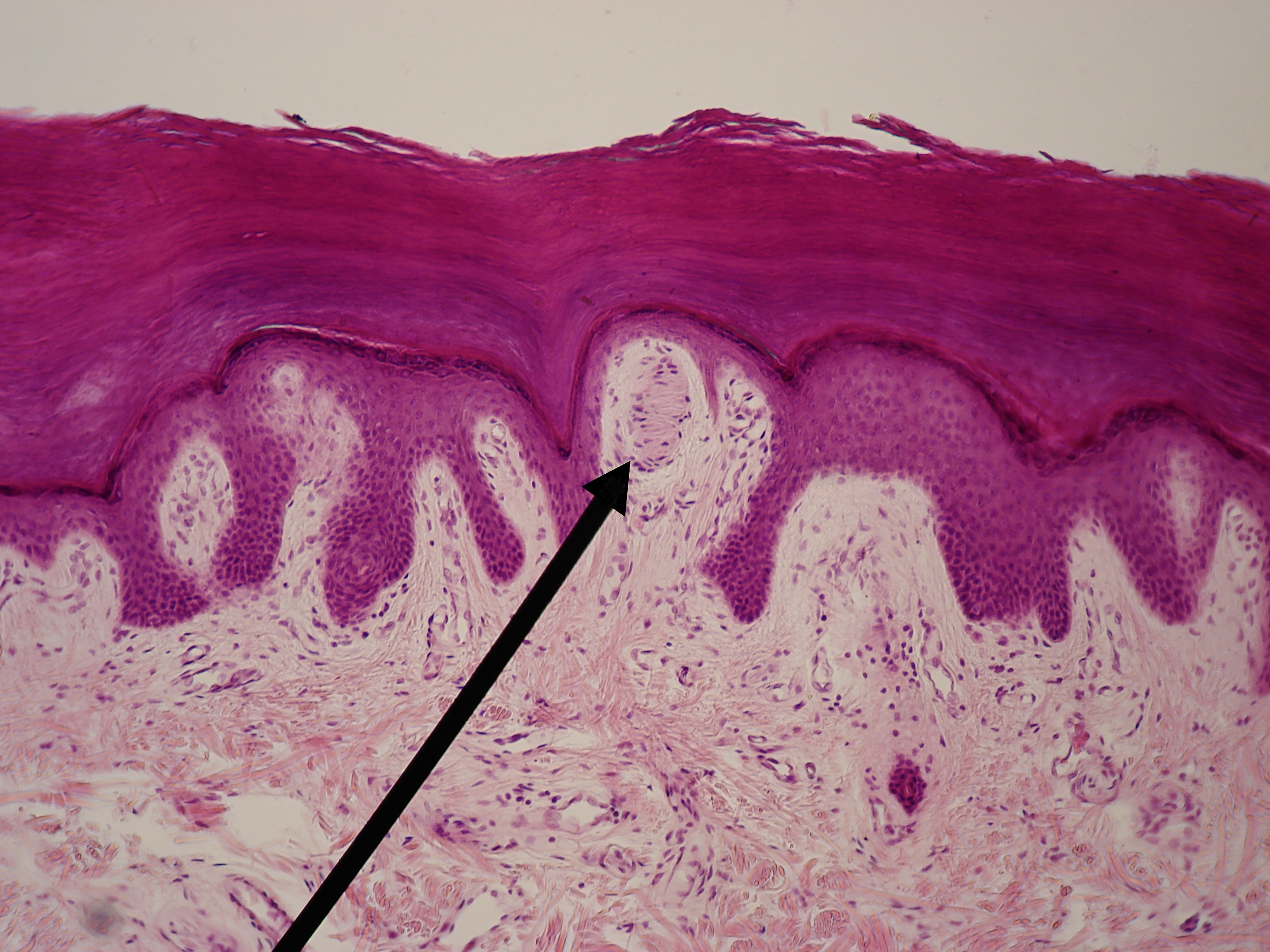
light micrograph

== Sources ==
- Gilman S (2002). "Joint position sense and vibration sense: anatomical organisation and assessment". Journal of Neurology, Neurosurgery, and Psychiatry. 73 (5): 473–477. doi:10.1136/jnnp.73.5.473. PMC 1738112. PMID 12397137.
- Suazo, Iván; Vega, José A.; García-Mesa, Yolanda; García-Piqueras, Jorge; García-Suárez, Olivia; Cobo, Teresa (2022-03-09). "The Lamellar Cells of Vertebrate Meissner and Pacinian Corpuscles: Development, Characterization, and Functions". Frontiers in Neuroscience. 16. doi:10.3389/fnins.2022.790130. ISSN 1662-453X. PMC 8959428. PMID 35356056.
