= Sensillum =

Sensory organ of arthropods

A sensillum (plural sensilla) is an arthropod sensory organ protruding from the cuticle of exoskeleton, or sometimes lying within or beneath it. Sensilla appear as small hairs or pegs over an individual's body. Inside each sensillum there are two to four sensory neurons. These neurons, or receptors, gather information about environment the arthropod is in:

- Chemoreceptors (i.e. trichoid, basionic, coeloconic, placodea)
- Mechanoreceptors (e.g.: bristle sensilla, campaniform sensilla, hair plates, chordotonal neurons)
- Thermoreceptors
- Hygroreceptors

Most sensilla are specially shaped according to the type of information they are gathering.

In spiders, slit sensilla are used to detect substrate vibrations, while trichobothria are used to detect air-borne vibrations.

== Chemoreceptors ==
Chemo-reception is one of the most dominant senses in the insect kingdom. Many arthropods use chemical signals to locate food, shelter and mates.

Other invertebrates have similar sensory organs also referred to as sensilla; these consist of various papillae or ciliated areas of the cuticle connected to sensory neurons and occur in velvet worms, tardigrades and leeches.
