= Gustav Becking =

German musicologist

Gustav Wilhelm Becking (4 March 1894 – 9 May 1945) was a German musicologist who studied with Wolf and Hugo Riemann. Becking did his doctorate in 1920. He worked as a professor at Utrecht from 1929, in Prague from 1930 according to The New Grove.

Becking was, along with Joseph and Otmar Rutz, Eduard Sievers, and Alexander Truslit, one of the pioneers of composer pulse theory. This theory combines the rhythmic patterns in music with physical movement. The latter can be represented with conducting curves, so called Becking curves. Becking classified these curves into three categories in which all composers can be placed (Rink 1995 : 64–77).
