= Slit sensilla =

The slit sensilla, also known as the slit sense organ, is a small mechanoreceptory organ or group of organs in the exoskeleton of arachnids which detects physical deformation or strain due to forces experienced by the animal. The organ appears in the vast majority of discovered arachnids, and is "remarkably consistent" in location and direction within each order. The arachnid slit sensilla corresponds to the campaniform sensilla found in insects.

Slit sensilla tend to be widely distributed over the arachnid's exoskeleton, but have also been found to be grouped at specific locations and in a bundle of parallel lines; the latter distribution is referred to as a "lyriform organ". The term "lyriform organ" comes from the shape of such grouped slit sensilla, which resembles a lyre. Arachnids with lyriform slit sensilla are commonly used as experimental subjects for investigations into mechanosensation because the almost 2D structure of their slit sensilla allows for relatively simple understanding of the system; thus, the results of electrostimulation on such arachnids can be easily recorded. Etymologically, "slit sensilla" are so named because they resemble a channel penetrating through the exoskeleton into the animal; despite this appearance, however, investigation has shown that slit sensilla do not actually penetrate the chitin of the exoskeleton, but merely represent a thinning of the material.

== Bibliography ==
- Pringle, J.W.S. (1955). "The function of the lyriform organs of arachnids" (PDF). Journal of Experimental Biology. 32 (2). The Company of Biologists: 270–278. doi:10.1242/jeb.32.2.270. ISSN 0022-0949.
- French, Andrew S.; Torkkeli, Päivi H.; Seyfarth, Ernst-August (2002). "From stress and strain to spikes: mechanotransduction in spider slit sensilla". Journal of Comparative Physiology A. 188 (10). Springer-Verlag: 739–752. doi:10.1007/s00359-002-0363-1. ISSN 0340-7594. PMID 12466950. S2CID 308783.
