= Anne Jordan =

Anne Jordan may refer to:

- Ann Jordan (born 1934), American company director and former social worker
- Anne Duk Hee Jordan, Korean-born German artist

== See also ==
- Anna Jordan (born 1979), English playwright, director, screenwriter and acting tutor
