= Hair plate =

Type of mechanoreceptor found in insects

Hair plates are a type of proprioceptor found in the folds of insect joints. They consist of a cluster of hairs, in which each hair is innervated by a single mechanosensory neuron. Functionally, hair plates operate as "limit-detectors" by signaling the extremes of joint movement, which then drives reflexive leg movement.

== Hair plate location and anatomy ==
Figure.1 Schematic of a hair plate. Hair plates are positioned next to folds within the cuticle, so that the deflection of the hairs signal the relative movements of adjoining body or leg segments.

Hair plates consist of a field of cuticular hairs, in which each hair is innervated by a single mechanosensory neuron (Figure 1). Hair plates are positioned within folds of cuticle at joints, and the associated hairs are deflected during joint movement. The number of hairs across and within hair plates can vary and hair plates are found on different body parts, including the legs, neck, and antennae. On the legs of insects, hair plates are found at the proximal joints (i.e. thorax-coxa, coxa-trochanter, and trochanter-femur joints) across the front, middle, and hind legs.

Hair plate neurons project into the ventral nerve cord where they arborize dorsally and around the leg neuromere. Moreover, the neurons of the hair plates located at the thorax-coxa joint project through the ventral, dorsal, and accessory prothoracic nerves, whereas, other hair plate neurons on the leg project through the prothoracic leg nerve. Lastly, the neurons from each hair plate may have distinct axonal morphologies.

== Sensory encoding and feedback circuits ==
Hair-plates are proprioceptors and provide information to the nervous system about the positional and movement state of the body and legs. Hair plate neurons come in two flavors, one that responds phasically (rapidly adapting) and another that responds tonically (slowly adapting) to transient or maintained deflections of the hairs. These encoding properties enable hair plates to signal the position and movement of adjoining body or leg segments. Neurons associated with the longer hairs within a hair plate form direct, mono-synaptic excitatory chemical synapses with motor neurons as well as synapses with non-spiking interneurons that provide inhibitory input onto antagonistic motor neurons. Therefore, hair plates provide rapid feedback to control the movement direction of the leg they are located on. It remains unknown what information the smaller hairs of hair plates signal and what that information is used for in leg motor control. Hair plate neurons are also involved in the presynaptic inhibition to other proprioceptors.

== Hair plate feedback to control behavior ==
=== Walking ===
Hair plates located at the leg joints provide sensory feedback for the control of walking. In stick insects and cockroaches, the surgical removal of coxa hair plates alter the extremes of leg movement in such a way that the leg may overstep and collide with an ipsilateral leg. Therefore, hair plates control the transition of leg movement direction as well as the extent to which legs travel during the step cycle. This "limit-detector" function is similar to that of mammalian joint receptors. Therefore, hair plates encode the extremes of joint movement during walking to precisely control the direction of leg movement.

=== Feeding ===
Mechanosensory information from front leg hair plates also contribute to the regulation of feeding behavior in fruit flies, Drosophila melanogaster. Integration of hair plate mechanosensory information with olfactory information from antennal neurons control the proboscis extension reflex (PER) in flies. Thus, the sensory input from hair plates is integrated with the information from other sensory modalities to control behaviors beyond walking.

=== Posture ===
Hair plates located on the neck (known as the prosternal organ) monitor head position relative to the thorax and provide sensory feedback for the control of head posture. In the blowfly Calliphora, surgical removal of the prosternal organ hairs on one side causes the fly to compensate by rolling the head toward the operated side. These results suggest that the prosternal organ may be involved in gaze stabilization.

Hair plates on the legs have also been shown to be important for resting posture. The ablation of the anterior trochanteral hair plate on a stick insect leg did not alter the coordination between legs, but rather resulted in that leg being held higher. Also, hair plates on the trochanter were shown to control the body height. Overall, in addition to controlling walking kinematics, hair plates are also involved in postural control.

=== Antennal movement ===
Hair plates located on the proximal segments of the antenna (Figure 2) provide sensory feedback for the control of antennal movement and are thought to play an important role in active sensing, object localization, and targeted reaching movements.

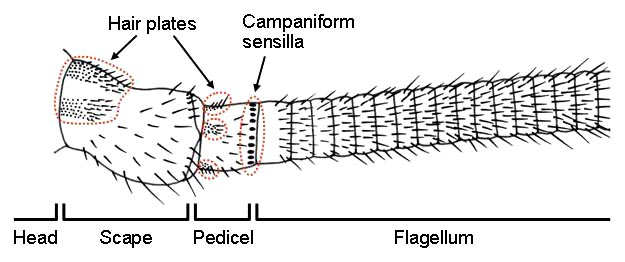
Figure. 2 Lateral view of a cockroach antenna, showing the hair plates at the base.

== See also ==
- Chordotonal organ
- Campaniform sensilla
