= Proprioception =

Sense of self-orientation

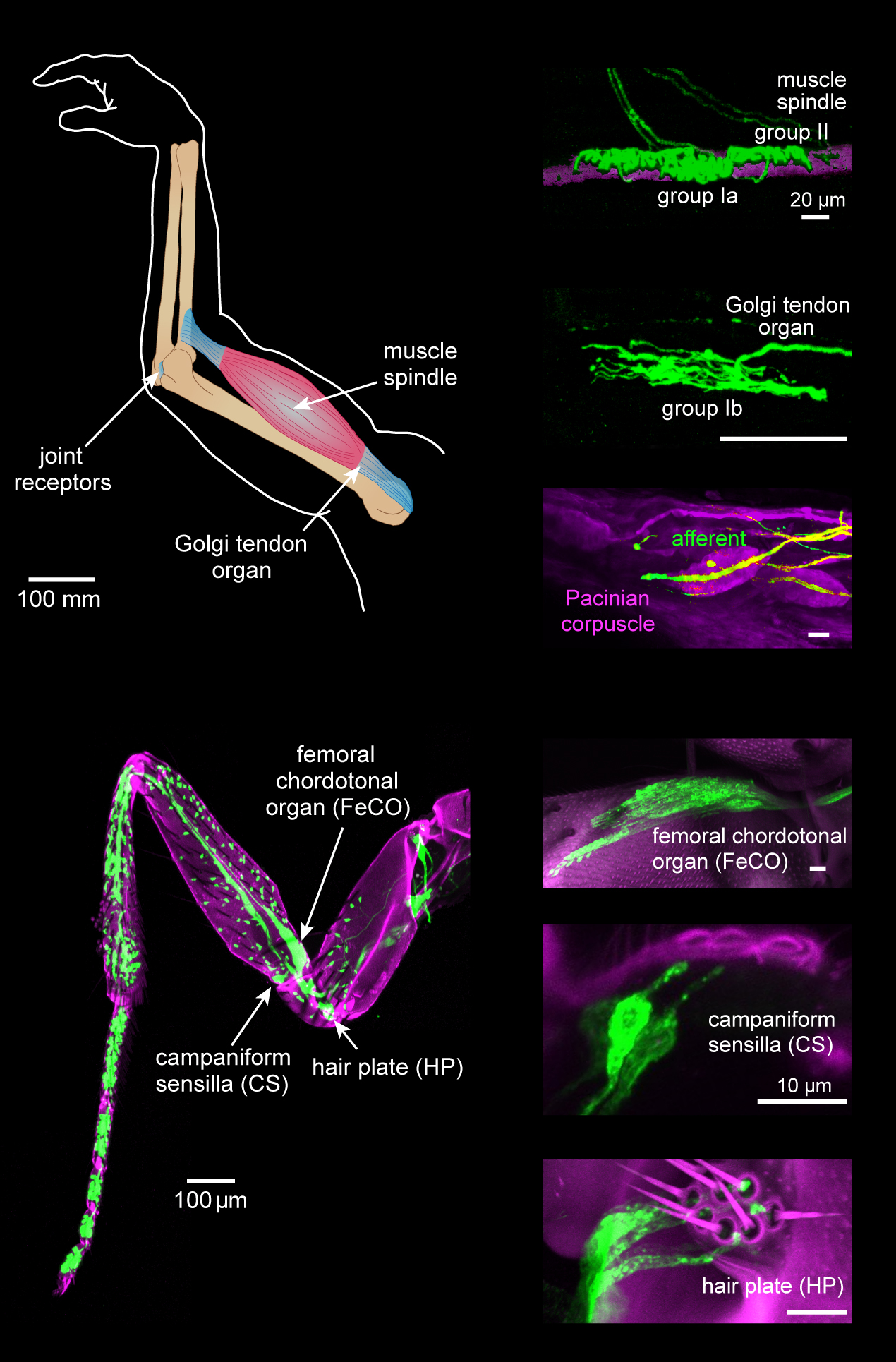
Schematics and images of types of limb proprioceptor neurons in mammals (top) and insects (bottom)

Proprioception (/ˌproʊpri.oʊˈsɛpʃən, -ə-/ PROH-pree-oh-SEP-shən, -ə-) is the sense of self-movement, force, and body orientation in three-dimensional space.

Proprioception is mediated by proprioceptors, sensory receptors located within muscles, tendons, joints and the vestibular organs. Most animals possess multiple subtypes of proprioceptors, which detect distinct kinesthetic variables, such as position, movement, and force. Although all mobile animals possess proprioceptors, the structure of the sensory organs can vary across species.

Limb proprioceptive signals are transmitted to the central nervous system, where they are integrated with information from other sensory systems, such as the visual system and the vestibular system, to create an overall representation of body position, movement, and loading. In many animals, sensory feedback from proprioceptors is essential for stabilizing body posture and coordinating body movement.

== System overview ==
In vertebrates, limb position and velocity are encoded by muscle spindle group Ia afferents responding to muscle length and velocity and muscle spindle group II afferents responding mainly to muscle length. There is a similar division of encoding in invertebrates; different subgroups of neurons of the chordotonal organ encode limb position and velocity.

Load on a limb is signaled by Golgi tendon organs: type Ib afferents. These proprioceptors respond to the force a muscle is exerting. Similarly, invertebrates have a mechanism to determine limb load: the campaniform sensilla. These proprioceptors are active when a limb experiences resistance.

A third role for proprioceptors is to determine when a joint is at a specific position. In vertebrates, this is accomplished by Ruffini endings and Pacinian corpuscles. These proprioceptors are activated when the joint is at a threshold position, usually at the extremes of joint position. Invertebrates use hair plates to accomplish this; a field of bristles located within joints that detects the relative movement of limb segments through the deflection of the associated cuticular hairs.

=== Reflexes ===
The sense of proprioception is ubiquitous across mobile animals and is essential for the motor coordination of the body. Proprioceptive afferents form reflex loops with spinal alpha motor neurons to provide rapid feedback control of muscles. These mechanosensation circuits are important for flexibly maintaining posture and balance, especially during locomotion. For example, consider the stretch reflex, in which stretch of a muscle is detected by proprioceptors (e.g., muscle spindles in vertebrates, chordotonal neurons in invertebrates), which reflexly activate motoneurons to induce muscle contraction to oppose the stretch. During locomotion, inputs from Golgi tendon organs can reverse their reflex action on motoneurons to promote rather than oppose stretch-related forces.

=== Conscious and nonconscious ===
In humans, a distinction is made between conscious proprioception and nonconscious proprioception:

- Conscious proprioception is communicated by the dorsal column-medial lemniscus pathway to the cerebrum.
- Nonconscious proprioception is communicated primarily via the dorsal spinocerebellar tract and ventral spinocerebellar tract, to the cerebellum.
- A nonconscious reaction is seen in the human proprioceptive reflex, or righting reflex—in the event that the body tilts in any direction, the person will cock their head back to level the eyes against the horizon. This is seen even in infants as soon as they gain control of their neck muscles. This control comes from the cerebellum, the part of the brain affecting balance.

== Physiology ==
Proprioception is mediated by mechanically sensitive proprioceptor neurons distributed throughout an animal's body. Most vertebrates possess three basic types of proprioceptors: muscle spindles, which are embedded in skeletal muscles, Golgi tendon organs, which lie at the interface of muscles and tendons, and joint receptors, which are low-threshold mechanoreceptors embedded in joint capsules. Many invertebrates, such as insects, also possess three basic proprioceptor types with analogous functional properties: chordotonal neurons, campaniform sensilla, and hair plates.

The initiation of proprioception is the activation of a proprioceptor in the periphery. The proprioceptive sense is believed to be composed of information from sensory neurons located in the inner ear (motion and orientation) and in the stretch receptors located in the muscles and the joint-supporting ligaments (stance). There are specific nerve receptors for this form of perception termed "proprioceptors", just as there are specific receptors for pressure, light, temperature, sound, and other sensory experiences.

Members of the transient receptor potential family of ion channels have been found to be important for proprioception in fruit flies, nematode worms, African clawed frogs, and zebrafish. PIEZO2, a nonselective cation channel, has been shown to underlie the mechanosensitivity of proprioceptors in mice. Humans with loss-of-function mutations in the PIEZO2 gene exhibit specific deficits in joint proprioception, (Note: The Piezo channel receptors play key roles in the perception of pressure, touch, and proprioception (Piezo2 receptor).) as well as vibration and touch discrimination, suggesting that the PIEZO2 channel is essential for mechanosensitivity in some proprioceptors and low-threshold mechanoreceptors.

Although it was known that finger kinesthesia relies on skin sensation, recent research has found that kinesthesia-based haptic perception relies strongly on the forces experienced during touch. This research allows the creation of "virtual", illusory haptic shapes with different perceived qualities.

=== Central pattern generators ===
Central pattern generators are groups of neurons in the spinal cord that are responsible for generating stereotyped movement. It has been shown that in cats, rhythmic activation patterns are still observed following removal of sensory afferents and removal of the brain, indicating that there is neural pattern generation in the spinal cord independent of descending signals from the brain and sensory information. It is currently understood that the spinal cord receives sensory input from proprioceptive organs and descending commands from the brain, integrates these signals, and sends activation signals to muscle through alpha motoneurons and fusimotor signals through gamma motoneurons in a coordinated and rhythmic fashion.

=== Muscle spindles ===
The muscle spindle is a proprioceptive organ that lies embedded in the muscle. It is a 1-3mm long encapsulated, fusiform (spindle-shaped) structure comprising contractile intrafusal (inside the spindle) muscle fibers and a central non-contractile region. There are three types of intrafusal fiber: bag I, bag-II and chain, which correspond to the dynamic and static responses of the afferents they influence. Spindles relay information through primary (Group Ia) and secondary (Group II) sensory afferents. Primary afferents innervate nuclear bag and chain intrafusal muscle fibers in the central region and secondary afferents innervate nuclear chain fibers at the ends of the spindle. Spindles encode extrafusal muscle length, velocity and acceleration. Recent studies suggest that they respond to the force and yank (the first time-derivative of force) exerted on intrafusal muscle.

Nonlinear features of muscle spindle responses to muscle stretch include initial bursts, history-dependence, and rate relaxation. Initial bursts occur at the onset of stretch and only last a very short time. History dependence refers to how the response of muscle spindles is affected by past stretch inputs. Rate relaxation refers to how the firing rate of muscle spindles decreases over time when held at a constant length.

=== Golgi tendon organs ===
The Golgi tendon organ (GTO) is a proprioceptive organ that lies at the muscle-tendon junction. GTOs relay information through group Ib afferents, and encode active muscle force. As they are connected at one end to motor units, individual GTOs only relay information on a few fibers. At the same time, GTOs exhibit self-adaptation, in which GTO response decreases after prior activation, and cross-adaptation, in which GTO activity is modulated by prior activation of another GTO. Similar to muscle spindles, GTO firing is characterized by a heightened response at the onset of activity (dynamic response) and gradual relaxation to a resting firing rate (static response).

=== Fusimotor system ===
Muscle spindles relay information to the CNS via afferents, and they receive efferent signals from the spinal cord via gamma fusimotor neurons. This gamma innervation modulates the sensitivity of muscle spindle afferents to stretch. Gamma motoneurons are categorized according to the static and dynamic response properties of the muscle spindle afferents they affect. In recordings with semi-microelectrodes inserted into peripheral nerves in humans, muscle spindle afferent firing rates increased during muscle contraction. This suggested that gamma motoneuronal activity was linked to alpha motoneuronal activity (alpha-gamma co-activation). Only small movements were studied because electrodes otherwise dislodged. In studies of locomotion in decerebrate cats, gamma activity was shown to be correlated with cyclical variations in joint angle. In cats performing normal walking, beam-walking, landing from falls and resisting imposed movement, the mean firing rates of muscle spindle primary afferents and their sensitivity to variations in muscle length changed according to task. Sensitivity greatly increased in difficult tasks and in states of vigilance, presumably due to increases in dynamic gamma activity. The terms fusimotor "wind-up" and fusimotor "set" were coined to describe these behaviors.

=== Motor control ===
In motor control, proprioceptors provide critical feedback to the central nervous system. Muscle spindles relay information regarding muscle stretch, Golgi tendon organs relay information regarding tendon force, and gamma motoneurons modulate muscle spindle feedback. Afferent signals from spindles and tendon organs are integrated in the spinal cord, which then output muscle activation commands to muscle via alpha motoneurons. Because muscle spindles and tendon organs exhibit burst-like activity in response to rapid stretch, they play a vital role in reflexive perturbation responses. In a simulation study, it has been shown that the controllability of a limb in response to a perturbation is significantly increased when utilizing muscle spindle and tendon organ feedback in conjunction. However, proprioceptive feedback is also critical in controlling steady movements. In one study, de-afferented mice were unable to walk as quickly as the control group, and showed some reduced activity in extensor muscles. It is also been shown in cats that disruption of feedback from muscle spindles impairs inter-joint coordination during ramp descent tasks. In a study on people with amputations, those with a higher degree of proprioceptive feedback from muscle spindles were able to better control the movement of a virtual limb.

== Anatomy ==
Proprioception of the head stems from the muscles innervated by the trigeminal nerve, where the general somatic afferent fibers pass without synapsing in the trigeminal ganglion (first-order sensory neuron), reaching the mesencephalic tract and the mesencephalic nucleus of trigeminal nerve. Proprioception of limbs often occurs due to receptors in connective tissue near joints.

== Function ==
=== Stability ===
An important role for proprioception is to allow an animal to stabilize itself against perturbations. For instance, for a person to walk or stand upright, they must continuously monitor their posture and adjust muscle activity as needed to provide balance. Similarly, when walking on unfamiliar terrain, or even tripping, the person must adjust the output of their muscles quickly based on estimated limb position and velocity. Proprioceptor reflex circuits are thought to play an important role to allow fast and unconscious execution of these behaviors. To make control of these behaviors efficient, proprioceptors are also thought to regulate reciprocal inhibition in muscles, leading to agonist-antagonist muscle pairs.

=== Planning and refining movements ===
When planning complex movements such as reaching or grooming, an animal must consider the current position and velocity of its limb and use that information to adjust dynamics to target a final position. If the animal's estimate of its limb's initial position is wrong, then a deficiency in the movement can result. Furthermore, proprioception is crucial in refining the movement if it deviates from the trajectory.

== Development ==
In adult fruit flies, each proprioceptor class arises from a specific cell lineage (i.e. each chordotonal neuron is from the chordotonal neuron lineage, although multiple lineages give rise to sensory bristles). After the last cell division, proprioceptors send out axons toward the central nervous system and are guided by hormonal gradients to reach stereotyped synapses. The mechanisms underlying axon guidance are similar across invertebrates and vertebrates.

In mammals with longer gestation periods, muscle spindles are fully formed at birth. Muscle spindles continue to grow throughout post-natal development as muscles grow.

== Mathematical models ==
Proprioceptors transfer the mechanical state of the body into patterns of neural activity. This transfer can be modeled mathematically, for example to better understand the internal workings of a proprioceptor or to provide more realistic feedback in neuromechanical simulations.

Various proprioceptor models of complexity have been developed. They range from simple phenomenological models to complex structural models, in which the mathematical elements correspond to anatomical features of the proprioceptor. The focus has been on muscle spindles, but Golgi tendon organs and insects' hair plates have been modeled too.

=== Muscle spindles ===
Poppele and Bowman used linear system theory to model mammalian muscle spindles Ia and II afferents. They recorded from a set of muscle spindles devoid of fusimotor action, measured their response to a series of sinusoidal and step function stretches, and fit a transfer function to the spike rate. They found that the following Laplace transfer function describes the firing rate responses of the primary sensory fibers for a change in length:

$H(s) = K_1 \frac{s(s+0.44)(s+11.3)(s+44)}{(s + 0.04)(s+0.816)}$

The following equation describes the response of secondary sensory fibers:

$H(s) = K_2 \frac{(s+0.44)(s+11.3)}{s+0.816}$

More recently, Blum et al. showed that the muscle spindle firing rate is modeled better as tracking the force of inactive muscle, rather than the length. Furthermore, muscle spindle firing rates show history dependence which cannot be modeled by a linear time-invariant system model.

=== Golgi tendon organs ===
Houk and Simon provided one of the first mathematical models of a Golgi tendon organ receptor, modeling the firing rate of the receptor as a function of the muscle tension force. Just as for muscle spindles, they find that, as the receptors respond linearly to sine waves of different frequencies and has little variance in response over time to the same stimulus, Golgi tendon organ receptors may be modeled as linear time-invariant systems. Specifically, they find that the firing rate of a Golgi tendon organ receptor may be modeled as a sum of 3 decaying exponentials:

$r(t) = K[1 + A\exp(-at) + B \exp(-b t) + C \exp(-c t)] u(t)$

where $r(t)$ is the firing rate and $u(t)$ is a step function of force.

The corresponding Laplace transfer function for this system is:

$H(s) = K\left(1 + \frac{A s }{s + a} + \frac{Bs}{s+b} + \frac{Cs}{s + c} \right)$

For a soleus receptor, Houk and Simon obtain average values of K=57 pulses/sec/kg, A=0.31, a=0.22 sec^{−1}, B=0.4, b=2.17 sec^{−1}, C=2.5, c=36 sec^{−1} .

When modeling a cat stretch reflex, Lin and Crago improved upon this model by adding a logarithmic nonlinearity before the Houk and Simon model and a threshold nonlinearity after.

== Impairment ==
Temporary impairment affects athletes with conditions known colloquially as the 'yips' or 'twisties' or loss of 'air awareness' in the case of gymnasts.

Proprioceptive feedback is also linked to motor deficits in Parkinson's disease and cerebral palsy. People with cerebral palsy often suffer from spasticity due to hyperreflexia. A common clinical test of spasticity is the pendulum test, in which the subject remains seated and the relaxed leg is dropped from horizontal. In individuals with spasticity, the leg comes to rest much more quickly due to increased reflexive muscle contraction.

Computational models have shown that results from pendulum tests in children with spastic cerebral palsy are explained by increased muscle tone, short-range stiffness, and increased stretch reflex responses due to increased muscle force feedback. Pendulum test results are also dependent on prior motion, indicating that muscle spindle feedback is a large component of spastic movement due to the history-dependent behavior of muscle spindles. Increased proprioceptive feedback has also explained properties of gait in children with spastic cerebral palsy.

In addition to functional impairments, proprioceptive deficits are linked to compensatory adaptations in the central nervous system. In the study on people with amputations mentioned previously, those with a lower degree of proprioception showed stronger connectivity between their visual and motor cortices, which is interpreted as a greater reliance on visual feedback to coordinate movement. Those with higher degrees of proprioception also showed higher connectivity between brain regions associated with sensorimotor feedback and sensory integration.

=== Chronic ===
Proprioception, a sense vital for rapid and proper body coordination, can be permanently lost or impaired as a result of genetic conditions, disease, viral infections, and injuries. For instance, patients with joint hypermobility or Ehlers–Danlos syndromes, genetic conditions that result in weak connective tissue throughout the body, have chronic impairments to proprioception. Autism spectrum disorder and Parkinson's disease can also cause chronic disorder of proprioception. In regards to Parkinson's disease, it remains unclear whether the proprioceptive-related decline in motor function occurs due to disrupted proprioceptors in the periphery or signaling in the spinal cord or brain.

In rare cases, viral infections result in a loss of proprioception. Ian Waterman and Charles Freed are two such people that lost their sense of proprioception from the neck down from supposed viral infections (i.e. gastric flu and a rare viral infection). After losing their sense of proprioception, Ian and Charles could move their lower body, but could not coordinate their movements. However, both individuals regained some control of their limbs and body by consciously planning their movements and relying solely on visual feedback. Interestingly, both individuals can still sense pain and temperature, indicating that they specifically lost proprioceptive feedback, but not tactile and nociceptive feedback. The impact of losing the sense of proprioception on daily life is perfectly illustrated when Ian Waterman stated, "What is an active brain without mobility".

Proprioception is also permanently lost in people who lose a limb or body part through injury or amputation. After the removal of a limb, people may have a confused sense of that limb's existence on their body, known as phantom limb syndrome. Phantom sensations can occur as passive proprioceptive sensations of the limb's presence, or more active sensations such as perceived movement, pressure, pain, itching, or temperature. There are a variety of theories concerning the etiology of phantom limb sensations and experience. One is the concept of "proprioceptive memory", which argues that the brain retains a memory of specific limb positions and that after amputation there is a conflict between the visual system, which actually sees that the limb is missing, and the memory system which remembers the limb as a functioning part of the body. Phantom sensations and phantom pain may also occur after the removal of body parts other than the limbs, such as after amputation of the breast, extraction of a tooth (phantom tooth pain), or removal of an eye (phantom eye syndrome).

There is a decline in the sense of proprioception with ageing. This can often result in chronic lower back pain, and be the cause of falls in the elderly.

=== Acute ===
Proprioception is occasionally impaired spontaneously, especially when one is tired. Similar effects can be felt during the hypnagogic state of consciousness, during the onset of sleep. One's body may feel too large or too small, or parts of the body may feel distorted in size. Similar effects can sometimes occur during epilepsy or migraine auras. These effects are presumed to arise from abnormal stimulation of the part of the parietal cortex of the brain involved with integrating information from different parts of the body. Proprioceptive illusions can also be induced, such as the "Pinocchio illusion", the illusion that one's nose is growing longer.

Temporary impairment of proprioception has also been known to occur from an overdose of vitamin B6 (pyridoxine and pyridoxamine). This is due to a reversible neuropathy. Most of the impaired function returns to normal shortly after the amount of the vitamin in the body returns to a level that is closer to that of the physiological norm. Impairment can also be caused by cytotoxic factors such as chemotherapy.

It has been proposed that even common tinnitus and the attendant hearing frequency-gaps masked by the perceived sounds may cause erroneous proprioceptive information to the balance and comprehension centers of the brain, precipitating mild confusion.

Temporary loss or impairment of proprioception may happen periodically during growth, mostly during adolescence. Growth that might also influence this would be large increases or drops in bodyweight/size due to fluctuations of fat (liposuction, rapid fat loss or gain) and/or muscle content (bodybuilding, anabolic steroids, catabolisis/starvation). It can also occur in those that gain new levels of flexibility, stretching, and contortion. A limb's being in a new range of motion never experienced (or at least, not for a long time since youth perhaps) can disrupt one's sense of location of that limb. Possible experiences include suddenly feeling that feet or legs are missing from one's mental self-image; needing to look down at one's limbs to be sure they are still there; and falling down while walking, especially when attention is focused upon something other than the act of walking.

=== Diagnosis ===
Impaired proprioception may be diagnosed through a series of tests, each focusing on a different functional aspect of proprioception.

The Romberg's test is often used to assess balance. The subject must stand with feet together and eyes closed without support for 30 seconds. If the subject loses balance and falls, it is an indicator for impaired proprioception.

For evaluating proprioception's contribution to motor control, a common protocol is joint position matching. The patient is blindfolded while a joint is moved to a specific angle for a given period of time and then returned to neutral. The subject is then asked to move the joint back to the specified angle. Recent investigations have shown that hand dominance, participant age, active versus passive matching, and presentation time of the angle can all affect performance on joint position matching tasks.

For passive sensing of joint angles, recent studies have found that experiments to probe psychophysical thresholds produce more precise estimates of proprioceptive discrimination than the joint position matching task. In these experiments, the subject holds on to an object (such as an armrest) that moves and stops at different positions. The subject must discriminate whether one position is closer to the body than another. From the subject's choices, the tester may determine the subject's discrimination thresholds.

Proprioception is tested by American police officers using the field sobriety testing to check for alcohol intoxication. The subject is required to touch his or her nose with eyes closed; people with normal proprioception may make an error of no more than 20 mm (0.79 in), while people with impaired proprioception (a symptom of moderate to severe alcohol intoxication) fail this test due to difficulty locating their limbs in space relative to their noses.

== Training ==
Proprioception is what allows someone to learn to walk in complete darkness without losing balance. During the learning of any new skill, sport, or art, it is usually necessary to become familiar with some proprioceptive tasks specific to that activity. Without the appropriate integration of proprioceptive input, an artist would not be able to brush paint onto a canvas without looking at the hand as it moved the brush over the canvas; it would be impossible to drive an automobile because a motorist would not be able to steer or use the pedals while looking at the road ahead; a person could not touch type or perform ballet; and people would not even be able to walk without watching where they put their feet.

Oliver Sacks reported the case of a young woman who lost her proprioception due to a viral infection of her spinal cord. At first she could not move properly at all or even control her tone of voice (as voice modulation is primarily proprioceptive). Later she relearned by using her sight (watching her feet) and inner ear only for movement while using hearing to judge voice modulation. She eventually acquired a stiff and slow movement and nearly normal speech, which is believed to be the best possible in the absence of this sense. She could not judge effort involved in picking up objects and would grip them painfully to be sure she did not drop them.

Lower limb proprioceptive work

The proprioceptive sense can be sharpened through study of many disciplines. Standing on a wobble board or balance board is often used to retrain or increase proprioceptive abilities, particularly as physical therapy for ankle or knee injuries. Slacklining is another method to increase proprioception.

Standing on one leg (stork standing) and various other body-position challenges are also used in such disciplines as yoga, Wing Chun, and tai chi. The vestibular system of the inner ear, vision, and proprioception are the main three requirements for balance. Moreover, there are specific devices designed for proprioception training, such as the exercise ball, which works on balancing the abdominal and back muscles.

== History of study ==
In 1557, the position-movement sensation was described by Julius Caesar Scaliger as a "sense of locomotion".

In 1826, Charles Bell expounded the idea of a "muscle sense", which is credited as one of the first descriptions of physiologic feedback mechanisms. Bell's idea was that commands are carried from the brain to the muscles, and that reports on the muscle's condition would be sent in the reverse direction.

In 1847, the London neurologist Robert Todd highlighted important differences in the anterolateral and posterior columns of the spinal cord, and suggested that the latter were involved in the coordination of movement and balance.

At around the same time, Moritz Heinrich Romberg, a Berlin neurologist, was describing unsteadiness made worse by eye closure or darkness, now known as the eponymous Romberg's sign, once synonymous with tabes dorsalis, that became recognised as common to all proprioceptive disorders of the legs.

In 1880, Henry Charlton Bastian suggested "kinaesthesia" instead of "muscle sense" on the basis that some of the afferent information (back to the brain) comes from other structures, including tendons, joints, and skin.

In 1889, Alfred Goldscheider suggested a classification of kinaesthesia into three types: muscle, tendon, and articular sensitivity.

In 1906, the term proprio-ception (and also intero-ception and extero-ception) is attested in a publication by Charles Scott Sherrington involving receptors. He explains the terminology as follows:

The main fields of distribution of the receptor organs fundamentally distinguishable seem, therefore, to be two, namely, a surface field constituted by the surface layer of the organism, and a deep field constituted by the tissues of the organism beneath the surface sheet.
[...]
the stimulations occurring in [the] deep field is that the stimuli are traceable to actions of the organism itself, and are so in much greater measure than are the stimulations of the surface field of the organism. Since in the deep field the stimuli to the receptors are delivered by the organism itself, (Note: in Latin: propriō) the deep receptors may be termed proprio-ceptors, and the deep field a field of proprio-ception.

Today, the "exteroceptors" are the organs that provide information originating outside the body, such as the eyes, ears, mouth, and skin. The interoceptors provide information about the internal organs, and the "proprioceptors" provide information about movement derived from muscular, tendon, and articular sources. Using Sherrington's system, physiologists and anatomists search for specialised nerve endings that transmit mechanical data on joint capsule, tendon and muscle tension (such as Golgi tendon organs and muscle spindles), which play a large role in proprioception.

Primary endings of muscle spindles "respond to the size of a muscle length change and its speed" and "contribute both to the sense of limb position and movement". Secondary endings of muscle spindles detect changes in muscle length, and thus supply information regarding only the sense of position. Essentially, muscle spindles are stretch receptors. It has been accepted that cutaneous receptors also contribute directly to proprioception by providing "accurate perceptual information about joint position and movement", and this knowledge is combined with information from the muscle spindles.

=== Etymology ===
Proprioception is from Latin proprius, meaning "one's own", "individual", and capio, capere, to take or grasp. Thus to grasp one's own position in space, including the position of the limbs in relation to each other and the body as a whole.

The word kinesthesia or kinæsthesia (kinesthetic sense) refers to movement sense, but has been used inconsistently to refer either to proprioception alone or to the brain's integration of proprioceptive and vestibular inputs. Kinesthesia is a modern medical term composed of elements from Greek; kinein "to set in motion; to move" (from PIE root *keie- "to set in motion") + aisthesis "perception, feeling" (from PIE root *au- "to perceive").

== Plants and bacteria ==
Although they lack neurons, systems responding to stimuli (analogous to the sensory system in animals with a nervous system, which includes the proprioception) have also been described in some plants (angiosperms). Terrestrial plants control the orientation of their primary growth through the sensing of several vectorial stimuli such as the light gradient or the gravitational acceleration. This control has been called tropism. A quantitative study of shoot gravitropism demonstrated that, when a plant is tilted, it cannot recover a steady erected posture under the sole driving of the sensing of its angular deflection versus gravity. An additional control through the continuous sensing of its curvature by the organ and the subsequent driving an active straightening process are required. Being a sensing by the plant of the relative configuration of its parts, it has been called proprioception. This dual sensing and control by gravisensing and proprioception has been formalized into a unifying mathematical model simulating the complete driving of the gravitropic movement. This model has been validated on 11 species sampling the phylogeny of land angiosperms, and on organs of very contrasted sizes, ranging from the small germination of wheat (coleoptile) to the trunk of poplar trees.

Further studies have shown that the cellular mechanism of proprioception in plants involves myosin and actin, and seems to occur in specialized cells. Proprioception was then found to be involved in other tropisms and to be central also to the control of nutation.

The discovery of proprioception in plants has generated an interest in the popular science and generalist media. This is because this discovery questions a long-lasting a priori that we have on plants. In some cases this has led to a shift between proprioception and self-awareness or self-consciousness. There is no scientific ground for such a semantic shift. Indeed, even in animals, proprioception can be unconscious; so, it is thought to be in plants.

Recent studies suggest that bacteria have control systems that may resemble proprioception.

== See also ==
- Balance disorder – Physiological disturbance of perception
- Body schema – Postural model that keeps track of limb position
- Broken escalator phenomenon – Illusion when stepping onto a broken escalator
- Dizziness – Neurological condition causing impairment in spatial perception and stability
- Equilibrioception – Physiological sense regarding posture
- Hand–eye coordination – Coordination between the eyes and hand
- Ideomotor phenomenon – Concept in hypnosis and psychological research
- Illusions of self-motion – Misperception of one's location or movement
- Instinctive aiming – Shooting method where the weapon's sights are not used or relied on
- Kinaesthetics – Study of body motion and perception of motion
- Kinesthetic learning – Learning by physical activities
- List of distinct cell types in the adult human body
- Motion sickness – Nausea caused by motion or perceived motion
- Motor control – Regulation of movement within organisms possessing a nervous system
- Multisensory integration – Study of senses and nervous system
- Seasickness – Motion sickness occurring at sea
- Spatial disorientation – Inability of a person to correctly determine their body position in space
- Theory of multiple intelligences – Educational model of human intelligence
- Vertigo – Dizziness with sensation of moving or surrounding objects moving
- Yips – Condition of sudden skill or control loss in an athlete
