= Alexander Truslit =

Music teacher and researcher

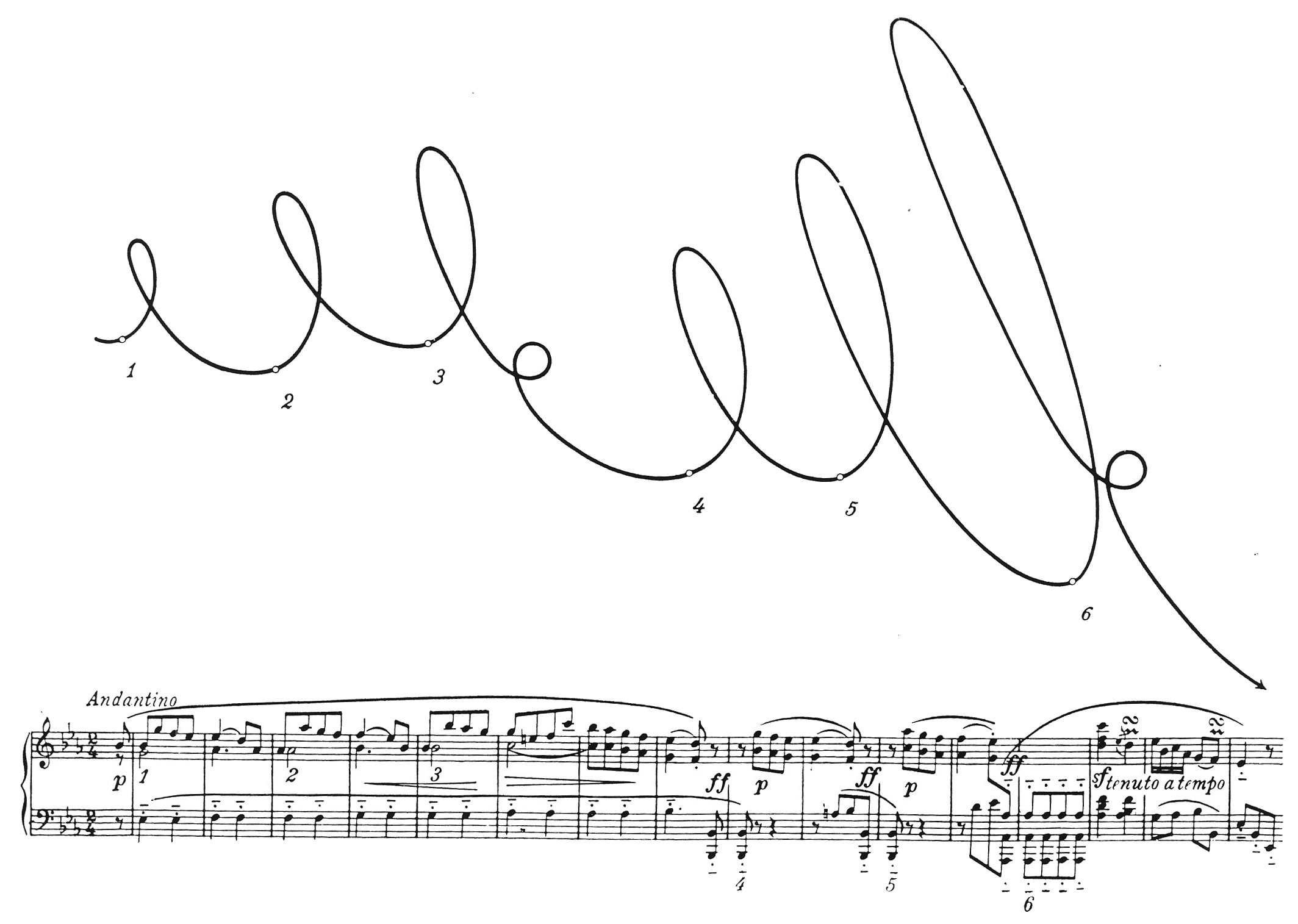
Alexander Truslit's motion curve to the Eb Rondo of C. Ph. E. Bach

Alexander Truslit (1889–1971) was a German-Russian music teacher, music researcher and pioneer in musician's medicine. He focussed on the connection between music and movement and developed his own musical body methodology. At the centre of his method is the kinaesthetics of music perception and music-making, which he illustrated with a graphic notation in the form of curved lines. He used his approach to treat many musicians' playing problems. Alexander Truslit's work has had a major influence on international performance research.

== Life ==
Alexander Truslit was born in Riga in 1889. He studied law, piano and medicine. He was the most important pupil of the Berlin pianist Elisabeth Caland, who is known as a pioneer of physiological-anatomical piano methodology. In 1929, he became director of the Elisabeth Caland School and the associated Research Institute for Artistic Piano Playing, where he focussed on human anatomy, auditory physiology and the relationship between musical and physical movement. He conducted research at the Charité in Berlin and published articles in journals. In 1938, his main written work 'Gestaltung und Bewegung in der Musik' was published (reprinted in 2015). In 1942, he produced the study film 'Musik und Bewegung' about his practical methodology (released on DVD with English subtitles in 2015).

Truslit taught his method at the conservatory in Luxembourg and tried to found his own school. In 1936 he met Elizabeth Duncan in Berlin and since then expanded the teaching at the Elizabeth Duncan School with his method. A Duncan student remembers the connection: 'Since the music is the basis for the Duncan dance, we should be enabled by the curves [of Alexander Truslit] to better recognise the music's own movement in order to make it visible in the dance interpretation.'

Alexander Truslit was also acquainted with Eugen Herrigel and Karlfried Graf Dürkheim and studied Zen and the art of archery with them. He went blind in the early 1950s and was no longer able to pursue his approach on a larger scale. However, he continued to teach and treat many musicians. Alexander Truslit died in Munich in 1971.

== Music is Motion ==
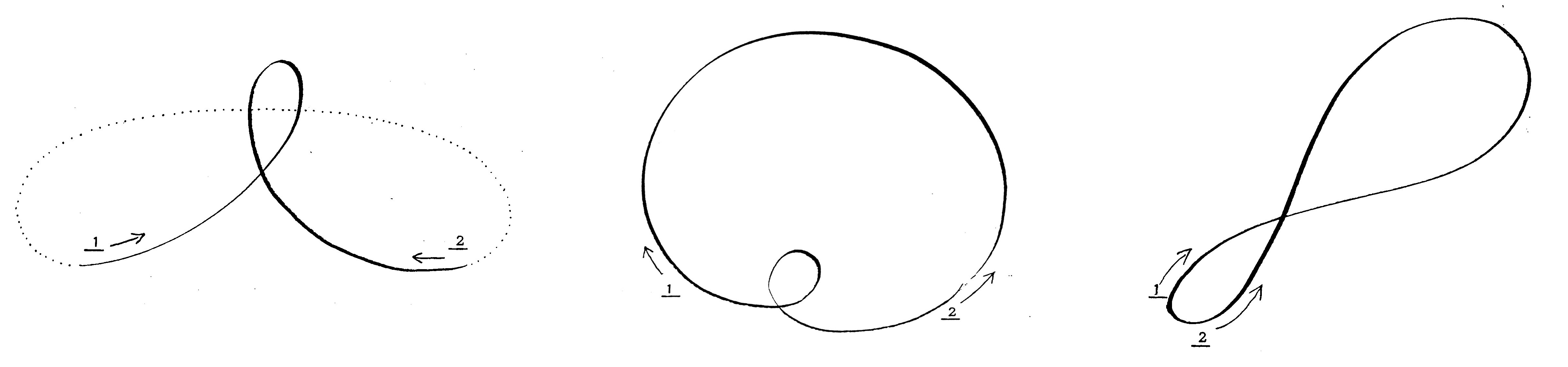
Open, closed and winding basic movements of Alexander Truslit.

At the centre of his method are three so-called primal or basic movements from whose combinations larger musical sequences are composed. They convey the sense of movement of musical motifs and entire phrases and are linked to the temporal development of an expressive musical performance. Accordingly, Truslit's main work is entitled 'Shaping and Motion in Music'.

As physical exercises, the movements develop a basic holistic disposition for artistic music-making. The central physical technique is the so-called wringing, which Truslit had adopted from the anatomist August Weinert of the Bauhaus. Wringing later also became known in Rudolf von Laban's dance methodology. Anatomically, wringing is achieved by a minimal counter-rotation of the upper arm and forearm. This involves muscle chains from the fingertips to the deep trunk muscles, which also involve breathing. In terms of body technique, Truslit is related to spiral dynamics by Christian Larsen.

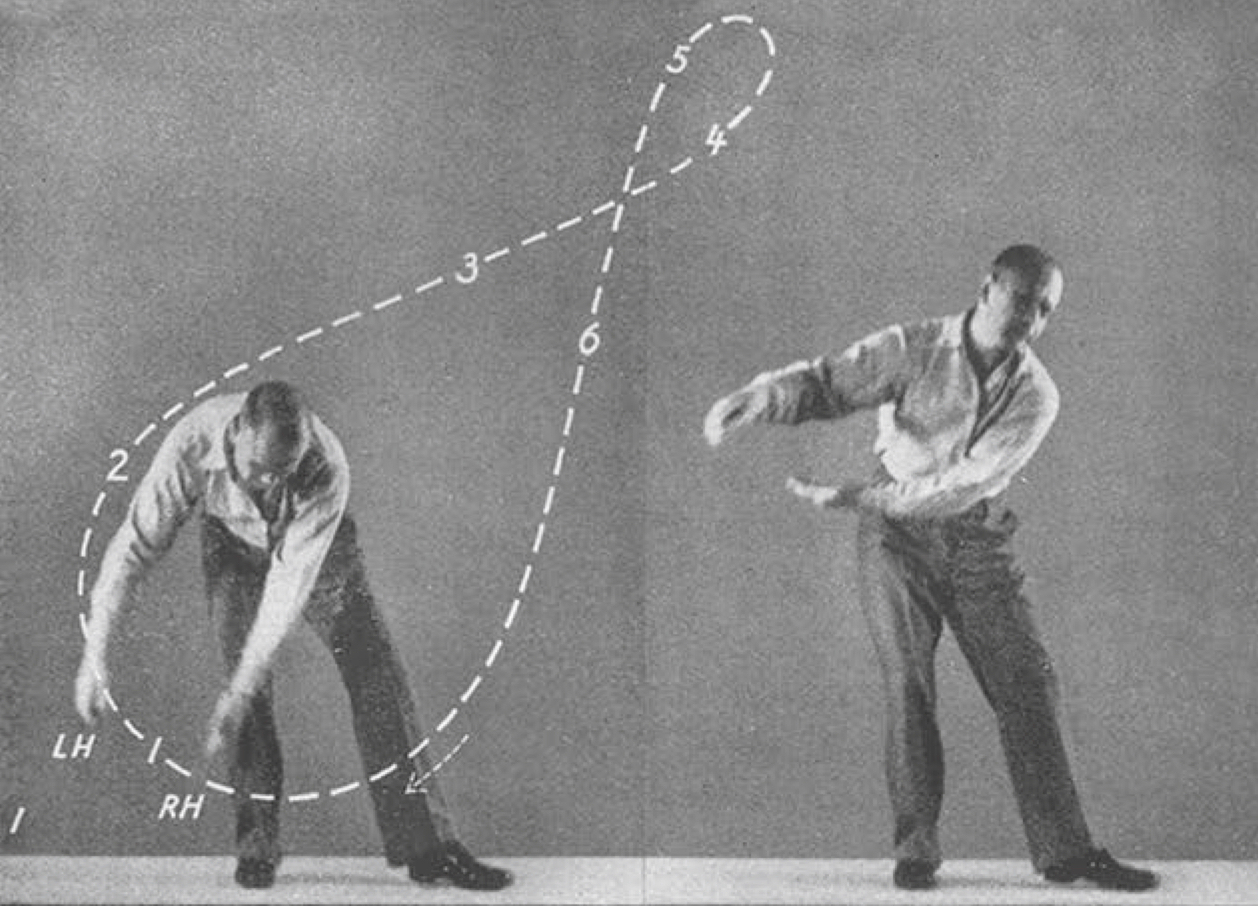
Alexander Truslit performing a motion exercise.

The connection between musical composition and kinaesthetics can be seen in the execution of movements to music that is heard or imagined. This connection was sought and developed in Truslit's courses. The aim was to experience music more physically and to become more aware of its movement patterns: 'In this process, movement sensations of round lines and corresponding patterns of physical tensions are linked to musical tension patterns. ... Musicians in particular develop a holistic self use through the exercises, through which muscular tensions and movements of the trunk and the body can later be ideally integrated into music-making."

== Music and motion research ==
Alexander Truslit's main written work is dominated by his attempt to scientifically prove his approach. He thus follows the tradition of his teacher Elisabeth Caland, who is regarded as a pioneer of a modern, physiologically based piano methodology. Truslit expanded the rolling movements when playing and the movement experiences he learnt from her into a general physical-musical basis for music-making.

In his research, Truslit tried to prove that the experience of musical phrasing as an inwardly rolling kinaesthetic experience of movement leads to a physically and artistically successful result. Using state-of-the-art audio analyses with the newly invented film gramophone, for example, he investigated the influence of his three basic movements on the dynamic and agogic shaping of their musical realisation. He also investigated the influence of a movement training on musical interpretations.

Furthermore, he tried to verify the plausibility of the movement curves by means of synesthetic music pictures of Farbe-Ton Forschung.

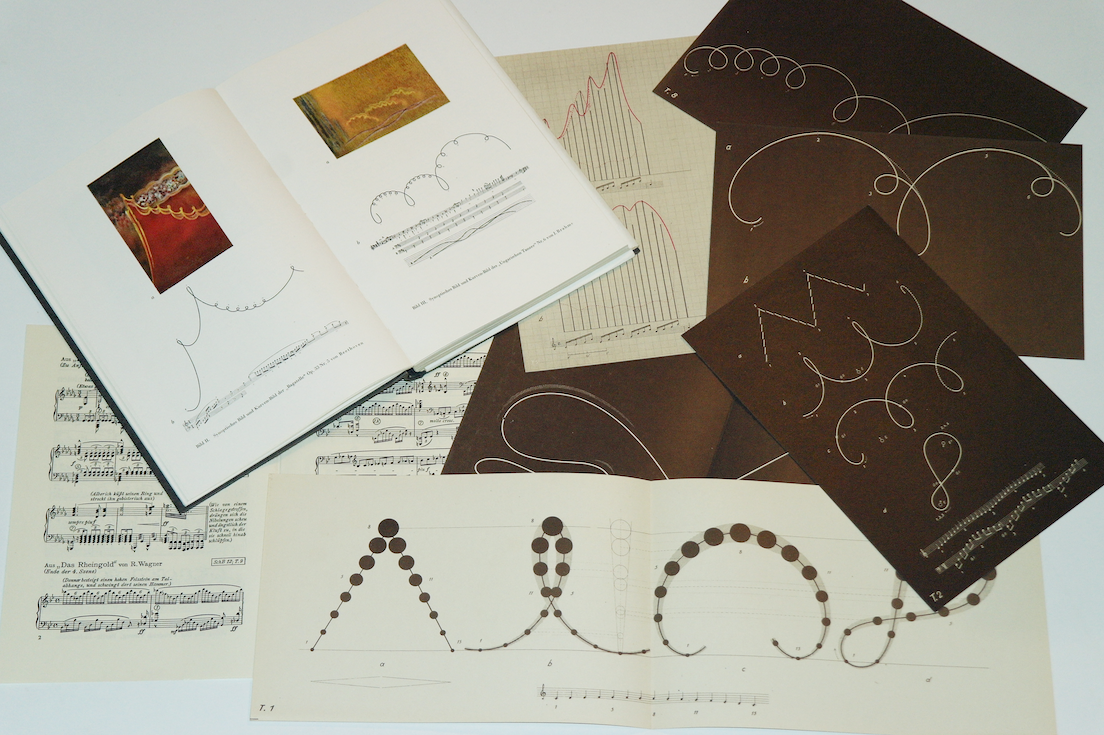
Alexander Truslit's book from 1938 with supplemental material. Additionally, three shellac discs were delivered.

The book was published in 1938 with extensive music sheets and pictures of curves as well as three shellac discs with music recordings discussed in the book.

== Modern body technique and theory of learning ==
Truslit's methodology is quite modern in comparison with today's music physiology and has parallels with modern learning theory. In accordance with implicit learning theory, Truslit did not teach a specific instrumental technique, but trusted that it would develop more easily and correctly through an external focus on the kinaesthetics of musical phrasing. This approach enabled him to treat playing difficulties caused by unfavourable playing habits of musicians.

While other body techniques, such as the Alexander Technique or the Feldenkrais Method, develop a healthy use of the self independently of music, what is special about Truslit's approach is that body technique and music are linked from the outset.

== Scientific analysis of the perceived motion in music ==
Truslit appeared to be especially open-minded regarding technical innovations of his time, which he strived to utilize for development of his methodology.

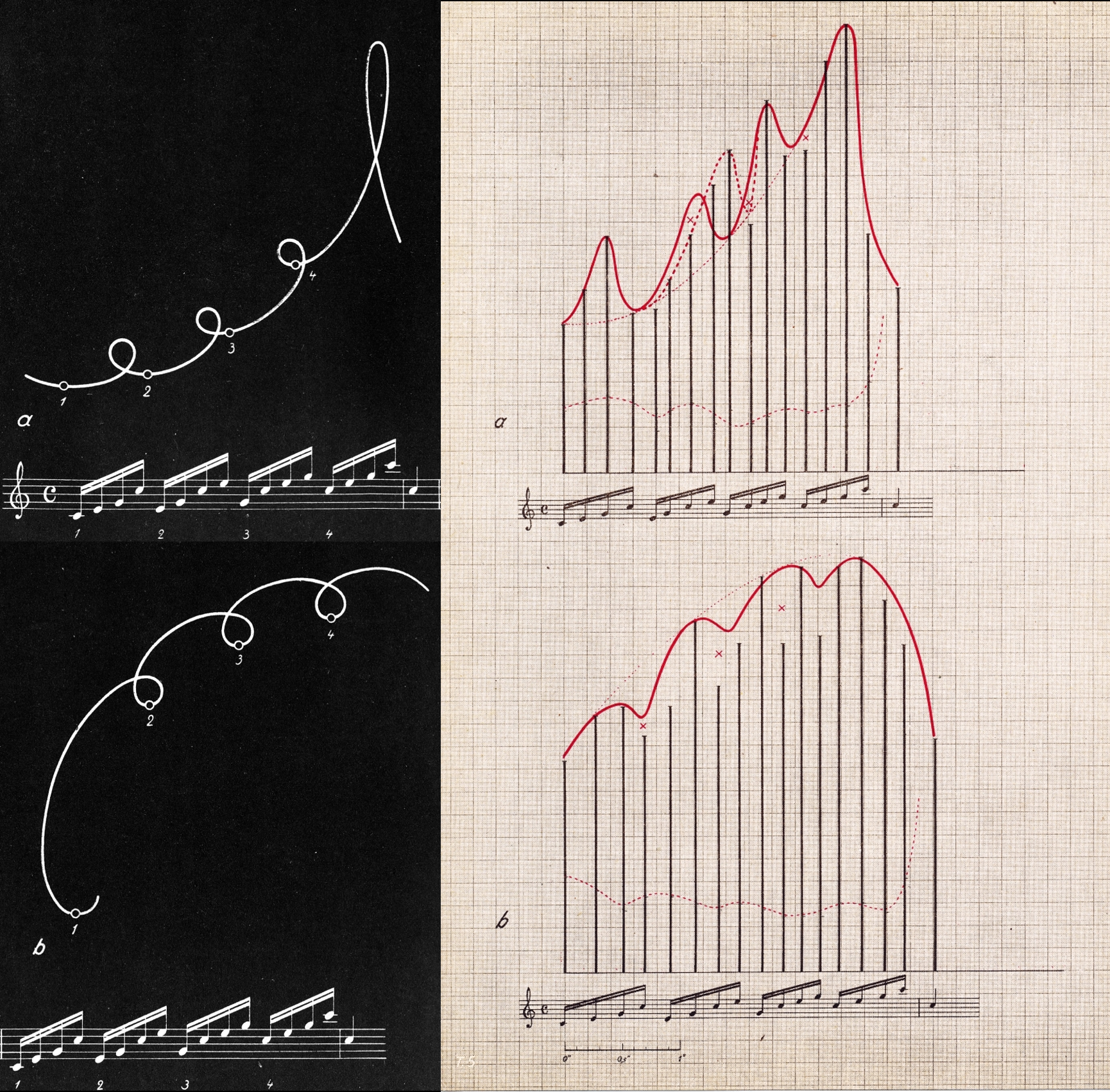
Musical sequence with application of two movement forms: open (a) and closed movement (b). Analysis of the audio signal with evaluation of tone duration and magnitude (Truslit 1938, plates 4 & 5).

Hence, his publication "Gestaltung und Bewegung in der Musik" is one of the first books, and possibly the first one on music psychology which includes sound examples on media. The three shellac discs presented comparisons of appropriate interpretations of music pieces with those seen as inappropriate. Within his tutorial film Truslit tried to clarify the transformation of body motion into movement curves and imagination of musical movement. For that purpose he used hand-held spotlights leaving light trailes on the film, which could then be redrawn for the animation.

In order to objectively investigate the influence of "dynamo-agogics" on the perceived musical movement, Truslit applied a "Filmgrammophon" (film grammophone) manufactured by Telefunken. This device projected an audio signal via a light beam onto a light-sensitive film of width 4 mm. It could thus be used to measure tone duration and magnitude up to a maximum frequency of 10 kHz. The application required a constant rotational speed of the record at 78 rpm. In combination with a constant speed of the film at 456 mm/s, a temporal resolution of 0.001 s could be achieved (Truslit 1938, p. 85/86).

== Impact ==
His best-known pupils to date are the opera singer Bruno Wyzuj, the pianist Luise Braun, the pianist Sebastian Peschko and the cellist Annlies Schmidt-de Neveu. Bruno Wyzuj studied with Truslit at the conservatory in Luxembourg and later became a singing professor at the Robert Schumann Hochschule in Düsseldorf. Annlies Schmidt-de Neveu made her debut with the Dresden Philharmonic at the age of 19 and performed as a soloist with the Berlin Philharmonic under Sergiu Celibidache in 1949. In between, she was heard at public lectures by Alexander Truslit.

Truslit tried to found his own school for musical composition in the style of the Duncan School, but this failed due to the authorities. His blindness after the Second World War prevented him from becoming better known in the post-war period.

Beside the application on music, Truslit's approach is beneficial for configuration of present-day sound environments. The perceived movement within sound plays a major role for modern sound design. In that manner, artificial sound of electric vehicles has to unambiguously communicate its kind and movement. In general, numerous sounds of daily life convey information on technical function, e.g. in the domestic home, or related to skilled manual activities.

== Reception ==
The violinist Hanna Struck described her own lessons with Alexander Truslit (Hanna Struck) in her music education thesis. He helped her to overcome her playing difficulties and thus enabled her to become a successful orchestral musician. Together with Truslit's study film, her work is the most detailed source of his practical teaching.

The major rediscovery of Truslit took place within international performance research, a branch of empirical music psychology. Bruno Repp published a short English excerpt from Truslit's book in 1993, and since then references to it can be found in countless studies. It is no coincidence that Truslit's 'hypotheses about the organisation of music and movement according to general, physical principles have had a lasting influence on current theories.' The first to repeat Truslit's own experiments in studies were Mitali Das, David Howard and Stephen Smith. Jörg Langner and Werner Goebl, like Truslit, investigated the tempo and dynamic shaping of various interpretations and illustrated them in diagrams. It turned out that interpretations with a more rounded shape were valued as more expressive by musical experts.

In 2012, Hans Brandner published an extensive monograph on the entire work and life of Alexander Truslit (English review) and came to the discovery that his work was not only a theory of music, but was based on decades of successful musical practice in the teaching and therapy of professional musicians. He described Truslit's approach as body musicality and kinaesthesia of music and has since published essays primarily on practical aspects of music. He created an experimental app for OSX with which you can record motion lines to music.

Michael Haverkamp researched about the synaesthetic aspect of Truslit's work. In 2015, he and Hans Brandner published Alexander Truslit's main work and, for the first time, his study film 'Music and Motion' with English subtitles as well as all the music and illustrative material for Truslit's book in a high-quality reprint.

The opera singer and singing professor Louis Landuyt was taught Truslit's approach by his teacher Bruno Wyzuj, who was himself a pupil of Truslit. He referres to Truslit's work in his own books on musical physical methodology.

The neurobiologist Neil Todd stated in 2015: "From a neurobiological perspective such motional percepts may almost literally be created as was predicted by Truslit, i.e. by either indirect associative links of sound shapes to vestibular centres in the body maps or by direct vestibular activation of body maps by sound above the vestibular threshold."

Very similar to Alexander Truslit is the approach of Alexandra Pierce, who recommends tracing melodic contours with the arms in order to promote musicality. Her method is not as far-reaching as Truslit's in terms of physical technique and systematic approach.
