= Anne Duk Hee Jordan =

Korean-German artist (born 1978)

Anne Duk Hee Jordan is a Korean-born German artist, living and working in Berlin, Germany. Transience, transformation, and ecology are central themes in Jordan's work.

== Early life and education ==
Anne Duk Hee Jordan was born in Korea and grew up in a small village in southwest Germany.

Before turning to art, Jordan trained extensively in kinesthetics, psychomotorics, and occupational therapy, working with autistic children and young people with complex behavioral and neurodiverse needs in Weinfelden, Switzerland. This therapeutic background, grounded in embodied perception and communication across cognitive differences, strongly influenced the later artistic approach to movement, relationality, and multisensory experience. Jordan also trained as a freediver and rescue diver.

After attending Berlin Weißensee, Jordan joined Olafur Eliason’s Institute for Spatial Experiments at the Universität der Künste.

== Career ==
Jordan is known for installations that merge art and scientific inquiry, with a focus on nonhuman ecologies, interspecies interactions, ocean environments and technology. Merging the human with nonhuman creates a universe imbued with a deep sensibility for ecological and social issues. Visitors of these dynamic ecosystems find recognizable elements yet the environments remain abstract, facilitating an imaginative space that the artist intends to help reprogram how humans are represented in the world among other species. Jordan often uses humor and whimsical aesthetics to appeal to wider audiences into artistic environments that foreground nonhuman organisms, critical perspectives of AI, technology, structural issues and the art world itself. Another significant part of Jordan’s artistic practice involves regenerative and socially engaged practice. Projects with UP Projects (Bodies of Water) and Tatort Paderborn (A Human Reconciliation with Water) activated local communities in ecological restoration, water protection, and collective stewardship.

Jordan had developed several research themes that feed into artistic work. 'Sex ecologies', developed with Pauline Doutreluingne, is a study of nonhuman sexual reproduction and queerness, highlighting how these systems challenge Western, patriarchal assumptions about sexuality and survival. Jordan creates machine ‘critters’ that are part of an ongoing series of ‘Artificial Stupidity,’ serving as a critical lens on artificial intelligence, exposing both its failures and its poetic potential. She has collaborated with the Schmidt Ocean Institute and TBA21–Academy. Critics such as Stefanie Hessler, James Voorhies, and Chus Martínez have situated her work within urgent discourses on speculative ecologies, queer embodiment, and environmental transformation.

Jordan has held a professorship in Digitale Medien at HfG Karlsruhe and is now professor for environmental practices at the Hochschule für bildende Künste Hamburg. Jordan’s practice positions technology not as a tool of domination, but as a medium for empathy, care, and planetary imagination.

== Awards ==
Jordan has been nominated for numerous prizes and scholarships, including the ACC Future Prize 2026, the Böttcherstraße Bremen Art Prize, the Hector Award Mannheim, the Gasag Prize Berlin, the Villa Romana Prize, and the Schering Foundation. Jordan has received the Leap Society Prize, a Neustart Plus scholarship from the Kunstfonds Bonn, and research and work scholarships from the Berlin Senate and the Goethe-Institut, among others.

== Press and publications ==
Jordan has given lectures and talks at institutions such as the Massachusetts Institute of Technology, the Rhode Island School of Design, the Zurich University of the Arts, the Royal Academy of Fine Arts in Ghent, the Nam June Paik Art Center in Seoul, the Free University of Berlin and the Berlin University of the Arts. Jordan's works and texts have been published in international publications, including The End is Where We Start From (Hirmer Verlag, Vienna), RE/SISTERS (Kerber Verlag, Barbican), Sex Ecologies (MIT Press, Kunsthall Trondheim) and Making Kin (Issue Art Journal).
