= Mechanosensation =

Transduction of mechanical stimuli into neural signals

Mechanosensation is the transduction of mechanical stimuli into neural signals. Mechanosensation provides the basis for the senses of light, touch, hearing, proprioception, and pain. Mechanoreceptors found in the skin, called cutaneous mechanoreceptors, are responsible for the sense of touch. Tiny cells in the inner ear, called hair cells, are responsible for hearing and balance. States of neuropathic pain, such as hyperalgesia and allodynia, are also directly related to mechanosensation. A wide array of elements are involved in the process of mechanosensation, many of which are still not fully understood.

== Cutaneous mechanoreceptors ==
Cutaneous mechanoreceptors are physiologically classified with respect to conduction velocity, which is directly related to the diameter and myelination of the axon.

=== Rapidly adapting and slowly adapting mechanoreceptors ===
Mechanoreceptors that possess a large diameter and high myelination are called low-threshold mechanoreceptors. Fibers that respond only to skin movement are termed rapidly adapting mechanoreceptors (RA), while those that respond also to static indentation are termed slowly adapting mechanoreceptors (SA).

=== Aδ fibers ===
Aδ fibers are characterized by thin axons and thin myelin sheaths, and are either D-hair receptors or nociceptive neurons. Aδ fibers conduct at a rate of up to 25 m/s. D-hair receptors have large receptive fields and very low mechanical thresholds, and have been shown to be the most sensitive of known cutaneous mechanoreceptors. A-fiber mechanoreceptors (AM) also have thin myelination and are known for their "free" nerve endings. It is believed that A-fiber mechanonociceptors have high mechanical sensitivity and large receptive fields, and are responsible for rapid mechanical and heat pain.

=== C fibers ===
C fibers have slow conduction velocities of less than 1.3 m/s because they do not have a myelin sheath at all. C fibers account for 60-70% of primary afferent neurons that innervate the skin. C fibers are activated by both mechanical and thermal stimuli, and also respond to algesic chemicals, such as capsaicin. Some C fibers respond only to mechanical stimuli. Therefore, classification of C fibers are broken down further. C-fiber nociceptors which respond to both mechanical and thermal stimuli include C-mechanoheat (C-MH), C-mechanocold (C-MC), and C-mechanoheatcold (C-MHC). C-fiber nociceptors that respond only to mechanical stimuli are called C-mechanonociceptors (C-M). Other groups of C fibers include C-fiber low threshold mechanoreceptors (C-LT), which are involved in nondiscriminative touch, and mechanically insensitive afferents (MIA), which lack mechanosensitivity and are also known as "silent" or "sleeping" nociceptors. C fibers called "C-mechano insensitive heat insensitive" (C-MiHi) account for about 15-25% of all C fibers.

=== Molecular mechanisms ===
Known molecular mechanisms of cutaneous mechanosensitivity are not completely understood. Most likely, a single unifying transduction process by which all sensory neurons function does not exist. It is believed, however, that sensory neurons employ fast, mechanically gated cation channels, and that the depolarization that results across the membrane is followed by the generation of a sodium-dependent action potential at the transduction site. It is believed that rapid, mechanically gated cation channels are characteristic of all sensory neurons. The membrane depolarization, in turn, leads to a sodium-dependent action potential at that location. It is also thought that mechanical strain is detected by ion channels through cytoplasmic and extracellular components. The existence of a distinct transduction process for all sensory neurons is highly unlikely. It has been hypothesized that the attachment of ion channels to cytoplasmic and extracellular structures is responsible for distinguishing mechanical strain on the cell membrane, and that cell curvature may not directly gate these ion channels alone. Mechanosensation also contributes to cell growth and development through extracellular matrix (ECM) interaction and traction of integrin receptors which facilitate adhesion.

==== TRP channels ====
The 'doctrine of specific nervous energies' states that particular nervous pathway activation causes various sensory modalities. Sensory receptor classification with respect to function suggest that different sensory modalities are governed by separate receptor classes. Transient receptor potential channels (TRP channels) (ion channels) introduce the idea that the expression of specific "molecular sensors" govern sensitivity to certain stimuli. Researchers believe that the ability of various somatosensory receptor neurons to respond to specific stimuli is a result of "combinational expression" of various ion channels in each specific neuronal class. Transduction channels work in their specific environment and should be treated as such. TRP channels play a significant role in mechanosensation. There are seven TRP subfamilies: TRPC, TRPM, TRPV, TRPN, TRPA, TRPP, and TRPML. Some of these TRP channels respond to membrane lipid tension, including TRPY and TRPC1. Others respond directly to mechanical force, such as TRPN, TRPA1, and TRPV. Others are activated by a second messenger, such as TRPV4. The TRPA subfamily plays a significant role in thermosensation. For example, TRPA1 is thought to respond to noxious cold and mechanosensation. The cytoplasmic content of each of these differs significantly, leading researchers to doubt that the cytoplasm is the core of mechanosensation.

==== Lipid bilayer ====
There is evidence that mechanosensitive channels may be in whole or in part governed by the lipid bilayer, which contributes to stretch forces which result in opening of the channel. While it is known that the lipid bilayer properties of cell membranes contribute to mechanosensation, it is yet unknown to the extent the protein interacts with the head groups of the lipids. The mechanosensitivity of TREK-1 channels in a biological membrane was directly attributed to the generation of phosphatidic acid in a fast two step process (<3 ms). Activation was based on a model where lipid micro domains, within the lipid bilayer, partition signaling molecules into separate compartments and mechanical mixing of the signals leads to the production of phosphatidic acid and downstream signaling.

== Hair cells ==
Hair cells are the source of the most detailed understanding of mechanosensation. They are present in sensory epithelia of the inner ear and are responsible for the auditory system and vestibular system.

=== Structure ===
The bundle of cilia that projects from the surface of the hair cell is the organelle which participates in mechanosensation. Each of these bundles are approximately 4-10 μm high and have 30-300 stereocilia and one kinocilium, which has motile characteristics. Along the axis of symmetry, each successive row of stereocilia is approximately 0.5-1.0 μm taller, with the kinocilium next to the tallest row. Extracellular structures connect the stereocilia together. These include ankle links (between adjacent stereocilia), shaft links (entire length of hair cell), and cross links (laterally between tips). Tip links run along the tips of the stereocilium, from the shorter end to the longer end. Tip links pull on the ion channels to open them up. It is known that the tip link is made of two different cadherin molecules, protocadherin 15 and cadherin 23.

=== Function ===
When an event occurs which causes the bundle of cilia to deflect toward the taller side, ion channels open, and the inward current causes a depolarization of the cell. This is known as a positive deflection. This process involves the stretching of tip links, which pull the ion channels open. A deflection in the opposite direction is termed negative deflection, and causes tip links to relax and the ion channels to close. Perpendicular deflection is ineffective. It is suspected that the site of transduction channels is at the stereocilia tips. The speed with which ion channels respond to deflection leads researchers to believe that mechanical stimuli act directly upon the ion channel, and do not need a second messenger. The sensitivity of cilia is primarily due to ciliary length. The stereocilia of functional hair cells have the ability to convert mechanical deflections to neural signals.

=== Current research ===
One aspect of hair cell mechanosensation that remains unknown is the stiffness of the tip links. Because the tip links are composed of cadherin molecules, computer modeling using steered molecular dynamics can estimate the stiffness.

==== Computer simulation ====
Computer simulation uses molecular dynamics calculations. The tip link consists of two different cadherin molecules. The molecular structure of the general cadherin class is known. The molecular structure is input into the computer, which then calculates how the protein would move using the known forces between atoms. This allows the behavior of the protein to be characterized and stiffness can be calculated. It has been found that the tip links are relatively stiff, so it is thought that there has to be something else in the hair cells that is stretchy which allows the stereocilia to move back and forth.

==== Animal studies ====
Animals are often used in research trying to discover the protein. Deaf animals are probably deaf because they have some kind of mutation in this particular protein, so a great deal of research has focused on trying to find animals that are deaf and figure out where the mutation is. For example, there are strains of mice that are deaf. Defects in their hair cells affect not only their hearing but their balance, so they tend to run in circles. These mice have been recognized for several decades as potential for identifying the mutation that caused this deafness and balance problems. Some are mutations in the two cadherins that make up the tip link, and others have been identified but none of them yet are the ion channel.

==== Channel blocking ====
FMI-43 is a dye which can be used to block mechanosensitive ion channels and therefore is a useful technique for studying mechanosensitive ion channels. For example, the blocking of certain subtypes results in a decrease in pain sensitivity, which suggest characteristics of that subtype with regard to mechanosensation.

=== Future studies ===
When the function and mechanisms of hair cells are more fully understood, there are two applications that it could have. These involve both basic research in other fields and clinical applications in the field of hair cells. The mechanism of the hair cell might contribute to the understanding other mechanosensory systems such as the sense of touch. In the field of touch, the ion channel is that is activated is also currently unknown, and it is likely that there are several different ion channels. Eventually, it is hoped that this research can help individuals with hearing impairments. For example, if somebody subjects their ears to extremely loud sounds, then they may experience hearing loss. This is probably a result of the tip links being broken. Normally the tip links grow back in about half a day, but for some people they are more fragile, making those individuals more susceptible to hearing loss. If the cause of this susceptibility could be determined, and if tip link are repair could be understood, then a drug could be developed that would help the tip links grow back more readily. Generally, many people lose hearing in their old age, especially high frequency hearing. This is caused by hair cell death, so it is hoped that techniques can be developed, such as by using stem cells or other genetic manipulations, to encourage the inner ear to regenerate its hair cells and restore hearing.

== Cellular antennae ==
Within the biological and medical disciplines, recent discoveries have noted that primary cilia in many types of cells within eukaryotes serve as cellular antennae. These cilia play important roles in mechanosensation. The current scientific understanding of primary cilia organelles views them as "sensory cellular antennae that coordinate a large number of cellular signaling pathways, sometimes coupling the signaling to ciliary motility or alternatively to cell division and differentiation."

== Neuropathic pain ==
Hyperalgesia and allodynia are examples of neuropathic pain. It is thought that the activation of specialized neuronal nociceptors are responsible for hyperalgesia. Studies suggest that hyperalgesia and allodynia are set off and sustained by certain groups of mechanosensitive sensory neurons. There is a general consensus among the scientific community that neuropeptides and NMDA receptors are crucial to the initiation of sensitization states such as hyperalgesia and allodynia.

=== Hyperalgesia ===
Hyperalgesia is extreme sensitivity to pain. Hyperalgesia to mechanical stimuli extends to a large area around the initial location of the stimulus, while hyperalgesia to thermal stimuli remains in the same location as the initial stimulus. Hyperalgesia which remains in the initial area is known as primary hyperalgesia, and hyperalgesia which extends to a large area is secondary hyperalgesia. Primary hyperalgesia probably relies on a central mechanism. It is argued that MIAs, or C-MiHi primary afferents, are crucial to the initiation of primary hyperalgesia because they have a significant response to capsaicin, which is a chemical commonly used to induce hyperalgesia. Secondary hyperalgesia is believed to be caused by a magnified spinal response to nociceptor stimulation. It is argued that heat sensitive Aδ nociceptors are responsible for secondary hyperalgesia.

=== Allodynia ===
Allodynia is pain resulting from an otherwise nonpainful stimulus. It is believed that restructured synaptic connections in the spinal cord are responsible for allodynia. Pain associated with allodynia can be attributed to myelinated A-fibers as a result of a change in their central functional connectivity. Mechanoreceptors with high sensitivity to movement, namely Aβ fibers, are believed to be responsible. It is not yet known whether just one particular movement sensitive mechanoreceptor or all of them contribute to allodynic pain. There is a general consensus that continuous C-fiber activity at the location of the initial stimulus is responsible for maintaining allodynia.

== See also ==
- Aδ fibers
- Action potential
- Chemical synapse
- Hair cell
- Mechanoreceptor
- Mechanotransduction
- Nociceptor
- Transient receptor potential channel
