= Kinaesthetics =

Study of body motion and perception of motion

Kinaesthetics (or kinesthetics, in American English) is the study of body motion, and of the perception (both conscious and unconscious) of one's own body motions. Kinesthesis is the learning of movements that an individual commonly performs. The individual must repeat the motions that they are trying to learn and perfect many times for this to happen.

While kinesthesis may be described as "muscle memory", muscles do not store memory; rather, it is the proprioceptors giving the information from muscles to the brain. To do this, the individual must have a sense of the position of their body and how that changes throughout the motor skill they are trying to perform. While performing the motion the body will use receptors in the muscles to transfer information to the brain to tell the brain about what the body is doing. Then after completing the same motor skill numerous times, the brain will begin to remember the motion based on the position of the body at a given time. Then, after learning the motion, the body will be able to perform the motor skill even when usual senses are inhibited, such as the person closing their eyes.

The body will perform the motion based on the information that is stored in the brain from previous attempts at the same movement. This is possible because the brain has formed connections between the location of body parts in space (the body uses perception to learn where their body is in space) and the subsequent movements that commonly follow these positions. It becomes almost an instinct. The person does not need to even think about what they are doing to perfect the skill; they have done it so many times that it feels effortless and requires little to no thought. When the kinesthetic system has learned a motor skill proficiently, it will be able to work even when one's vision is limited. The perception of continuous movement (kinesthesia) is largely unconscious. A conscious proprioception is achieved through increased awareness.

Kinaesthetics involves the teaching and personal development of such awareness.

== Therapeutic applications ==
Occupational therapy and physical therapy based on movement-associated awareness has been applied in the Western world since the mid-1980s, especially in Central European care facilities. It makes use of the psychophysiological finding that greater muscle tone reduces proprioceptive sensitivity. Kinaesthetics may benefit patients who need:

- Assistance in activities of daily living (ADL)
- Somatic feedback
- To reduce the physical effort required to move

== History ==
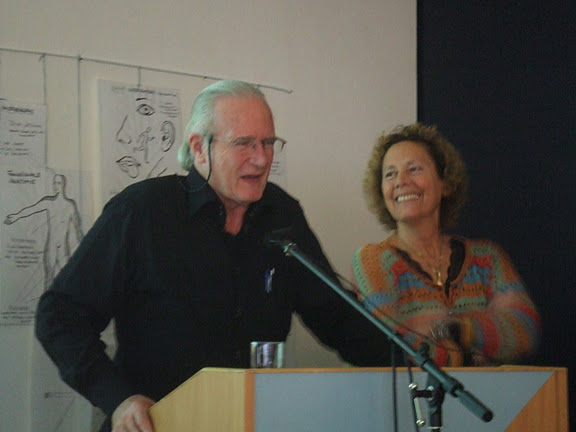
Kinaesthetics-founders Lenny Maietta and Frank Hatch (2011)

Kinaesthetics was developed in the early 1970s by Frank White Hatch, who was a choreographer and dancer. Hatch studied behavioral cybernetics at Madison/Wisconsin and developed academic programs for movement and dance called Kinaesthetics in three American universities. He then turned to working with disabled children as well as the field of rehabilitation. Psychologist Lenny Maietta (1950-2018) developed a handling training program for young parents that was also based on behavioral cybernetics. Hatch and Maietta taught and worked together in German-speaking countries beginning in 1977. With the dancer John Graham, they held workshops under the name of Gentle Dance.

Maietta and Hatch used Kinaesthetics seminars the first time as therapy in the Ernest-Holmes Fachklinik in Germany 1976–77. Together with registered nurse Suzanne Bernard Schmidt, Maietta and Hatch developed a job-specific program "Kinaesthetics in Nursing." They were in dialogue and exchange with Gregory Bateson, Moshe Feldenkrais, Berta and Karel Bobath, Liliane Juchli, and Nancy Roper. In addition to behavioral cybernetics and dance, movement therapy and humanistic psychology were named as key sources of kinaesthetics.

Maietta and Hatch are still actively involved in the development of Kinaesthetics. In the last years, programs for caregivers, for workplace health and for older people especially were developed. Currently there are four organizations in which Kinaesthetics programs are developed.

== Literature ==
- Asmussen, M. (2010), Praxisbuch Kinaesthetics. Erfahrungen zur individuellen Bewegungsunterstützung auf Basis der Kinästhetik (in German) (2. ed.), München: Elsevier, ISBN 978-3-437-27570-8
- Bauder-Mißbach, H.; Eisenschink A. M.; Kirchner, E. (2009), Kinästhetische Mobilisation. Wie Pflegekräfte die Genesung unterstützen können - eine Studie am Universitätsklinikum Ulm (in German), Hannover: Schlütersche, ISBN 978-3-87706-736-9
- Brandt, I., ed. (2008), Pflegetechniken heute. Pflegehandeln Schritt für Schritt verstehen, S. 232-247 (in German) (2., vollst. überarb. ed.), München: Urban & Fischer, ISBN 978-3-437-27091-8
- Citron, I. (2004), Kinästhetik - Kommunikatives Bewegungslernen (in German), Stuttgart: Thieme, ISBN 978-3-13-111862-2
- Hatch, F.; Maietta, L.; Schmidt, S. (1992), Kinästhetik. Interaktion durch Berührung und Bewegung in der Pflege (in German) (4., überarb. ed.), Eschborn: DBfK Verlag, ISBN 978-3927944022
- Hatch, F.; Maietta, L. (2003), Kinästhetik. Gesundheitsentwicklung und menschliche Funktionen (in German) (2. ed.), München: Urban & Fischer bei Elsevier, ISBN 978-3-437-26840-3
- Hatch, F.; Maietta, L. (2011), Kinaesthetics. Infant Handling (in German) (2., durchges. ed.), Bern: Huber, ISBN 978-3-456-84987-4

== Films ==
- Asmussen-Clausen, M. / Knobel, S. (2006): Fortbewegen statt heben - Kinästhetik in der Pflegepraxis (DVD)
- Asmussen-Clausen, M. / Buschmann, U. (2004): Kinästhetik Infant Handling - Bewegungsunterstützung in den ersten Lebensjahren (DVD)
- Bauder-Mißbach, H. (2008): "Grundlagen der Bewegungsförderung " (DVD)
- Marty-Teuber, M. (2000): Ermöglichen statt Behindern - Kinaesthetics ein Lern- und Interaktionsmodell (DVD)
