= Campaniform sensilla =

Class of mechanoreceptors found in insects

Cross-section of a campaniform sensillum. Each sensillum is embedded in a cuticular socket and innervated by a single sensory neuron. The neuron is excited when strain in the cuticle deforms the socket edges (collar) and indents the flexible cuticular dome (cap).

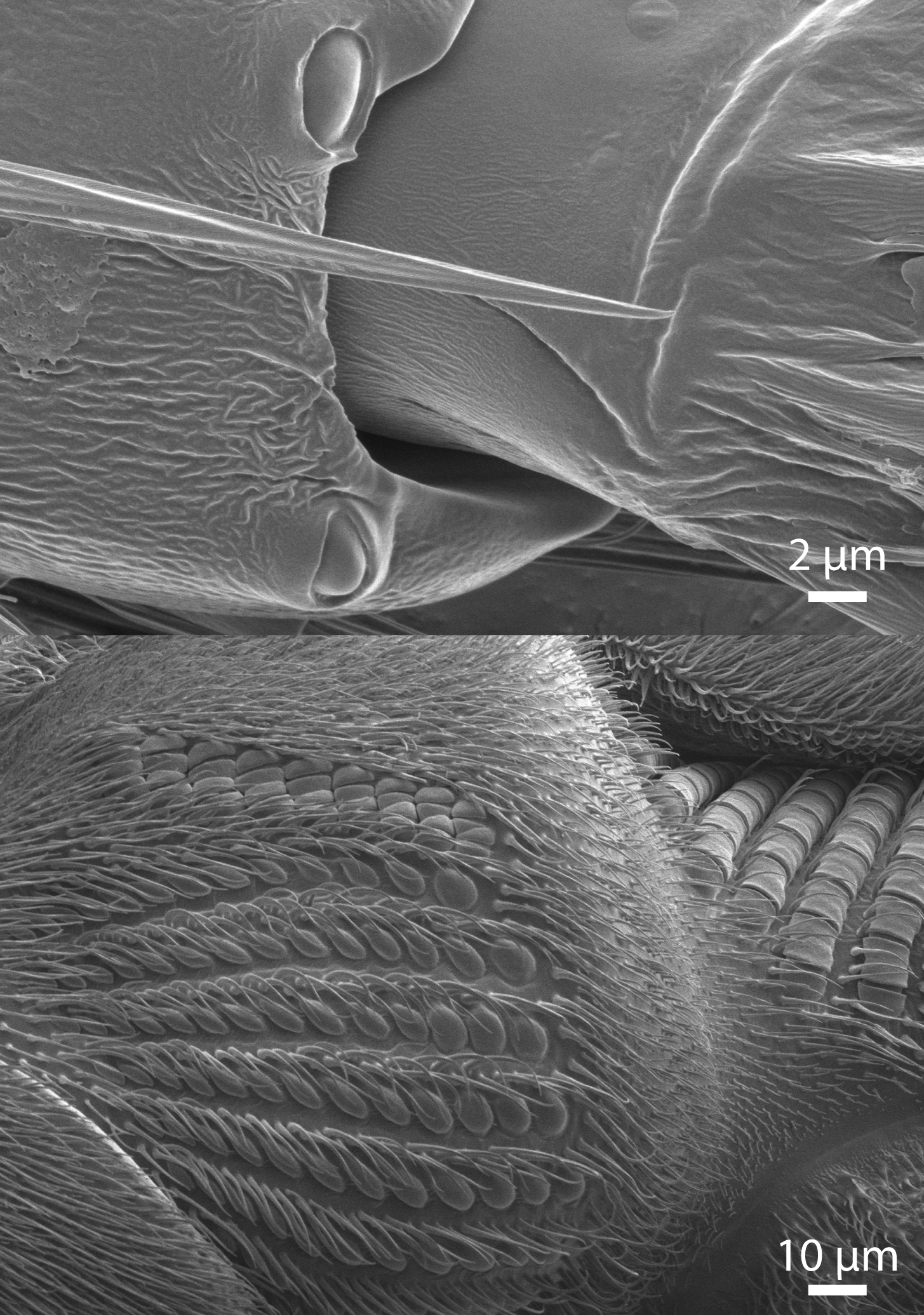
Top panel: Scanning electron micrograph (SEM) of campaniform sensilla on the tarsus of Drosophila melanogaster. Bottom panel: SEM of campaniform on the base of the haltere of a sarcophagid fly.

Campaniform sensilla are a class of mechanoreceptors found in insects, which respond to local stress and strain within the animal's cuticle. Campaniform sensilla function as proprioceptors that detect mechanical load as resistance to muscle contraction, similar to mammalian Golgi tendon organs. Sensory feedback from campaniform sensilla is integrated in the control of posture and locomotion.

== Structure ==
Each campaniform sensillum consists of a flexible dome, which is embedded in a spongy socket within the cuticle and innervated by the dendrites of a single bipolar sensory neuron (see schematic cross-section). Campaniform sensilla are often oval-shaped with long axes of about 5-10 μm (see SEM).

Campaniform sensilla are distributed across the body surface of many insects. The fruit fly Drosophila melanogaster, for example, has over 680 sensilla. Campaniform sensilla are located in regions where stress is likely to be high, including on the legs, antennae, wings, and halteres. Sensilla may occur alone, but sensilla with similar orientations are often grouped together.

Distribution of groups of campaniform sensilla on a stick insect leg (anterior view). The inset shows a top view of the two groups on the dorsal trochanter (G3 and G4). The sensilla of these groups have mutually perpendicular orientations. Each sensillum is preferentially excited by compression along its short axis (arrows). The proximal group (G3) is oriented perpendicularly to the long axis of the trochanter and excited when the trochanter-femur is bent upwards. The more distal group (G4) is oriented in parallel to the long axis of the trochanter and excited when the trochanter-femur is bent downwards.

=== Campaniform sensilla on legs ===
On the legs, groups of campaniform sensilla are located close to the joints on all segments except for the coxa (see leg schematic), with most sensilla located on the proximal trochanter. The number and location of sensilla on the legs varies little across individuals of the same species, and homologous groups of sensilla can be found across species.

=== Campaniform sensilla on wings and halteres ===
Distribution of campaniform sensilla (CS) on the wing and haltere of Drosophila melanogaster. Adapted from Aiello et al. (2021).

Campaniform sensilla typically occur on both sides of the wing (see wing schematic). The exact number and placement varies widely across species, likely mirroring differences in flight behavior. However, across species, most campaniform sensilla are found near the wing base. Computational models predict that this is an optimal location for sensing body rotations during flight, with sensing performance being robust to external perturbations and sensor loss.

In Diptera such as Drosophila, the highest density of campaniform sensilla is found at the base of the modified hind-wings, the halteres (see haltere schematic).

== Function ==
=== Response properties ===
When cuticular deformations compress a campaniform sensillum, the socket edges (collar) indent the cuticular cap. This squeezes the dendritic tip of the sensory neuron and opens its mechanotransduction channels (from the TRP family), which leads to the generation of action potentials that are transmitted to the ventral nerve cord, the insect analogue to the vertebrate spinal cord.

The activity of campaniform sensilla was first recorded by John William Sutton Pringle in the late 1930s. Pringle also determined that the oval shape of many sensilla makes them directionally selective – they respond best to compression along their short axis. Thus, even neighboring sensilla may have very different sensitivities to strain depending on their orientation in the cuticle. For example, stick insects possess two groups of campaniform sensilla on the dorsal side of their legs' trochanter whose short axes are oriented perpendicularly to one another (see inset in leg schematic). As a result, one group (G3) responds when the leg is bent upwards, whereas the other group (G4) responds when the leg is bent downwards. Round campaniform sensilla can be sensitive in all directions or show directional sensitivity if the cap is asymmetrically coupled with the surrounding collar.

The activity of campaniform sensilla may be slowly-adapting (tonic), signaling the magnitude of cuticular deformation, and/or rapidly adapting (phasic), signaling the rate of cuticular deformation. Based on their responses to white noise stimuli, campaniform sensilla may also be described more generally as signaling two features that approximate the derivative of each other. This suggests that the neural response properties of the sensilla are rather generic, and that functional specialization arises primarily from how the sensilla are embedded in the cuticle. In addition, activity adapts to constant loads and shows hysteresis (history dependence) in response to cyclic loading.

Campaniform sensilla project directly to motor neurons and to various interneurons, which integrate their signals with signals from other proprioceptors. In this way, campaniform sensilla activity can affect the magnitude and timing of muscle contractions.

=== Function of leg campaniform sensilla ===
Campaniform sensilla on the legs are activated during standing and walking. Their sensory feedback is thought to reinforce muscle activity during the stance phase and to contribute to inter-leg coordination, much like sensory feedback from mammalian Golgi tendon organs. Feedback from leg campaniform sensilla is also important for the control of kicking and jumping.

=== Function of wing and haltere campaniform sensilla ===
Campaniform sensilla on the wings and halteres are activated as these structures oscillate back and forth during flight, with the phase of activation depending on the placement of the sensilla. The campaniform sensilla on the wing encode the wing's aerodynamic and inertial forces, whereas sensilla on the base of the haltere are thought to encode Coriolis forces induced by body rotation during flight, allowing the structure to function as a gyroscope. Feedback from wing and haltere campaniform sensilla is thought to mediate compensatory reflexes to maintain equilibrium during flight.

=== Computational models ===
To better understand the function of campaniform sensilla, computational models that mimic their response properties are being developed for use in simulations and robotics. On robotic legs, the models can filter input from engineered strain sensors "campaniform-sensilla-style" in real time. One advantage of this bio-inspired filtering is that it enables adaptation to load over time (see above), which makes strain sensors essentially self-calibrating to different loads carried by the robot.
