= Sense =

Physiological capacity

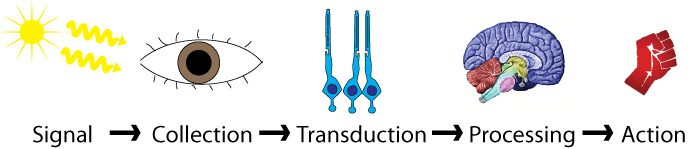
Sensation consists of signal collection and transduction.

The five major senses that most higher organisms have are: Sight (vision), Hearing (audition), Smell (Olfaction), Touch (Somatosensation), and Taste (Gustation).

A sense is a biological system used by an organism for sensation, the process of gathering information about the surroundings through the detection of stimuli. During sensation, sense organs collect various stimuli (such as a sound or smell) for transduction, meaning transformation into a form that can be understood by the brain. Sensation and perception are fundamental to nearly every aspect of an organism's cognition, behavior and thought.

Although, in some cultures, five human senses were traditionally identified as such (namely sight, smell, touch, taste, and hearing), many more are now recognized. Senses used by non-human organisms are even greater in variety and number.

In organisms, a sensory organ consists of a group of interrelated sensory cells that respond to a specific type of physical stimulus. Via cranial and spinal nerves (nerves of the central and peripheral nervous systems that relay sensory information to and from the brain and body), the different types of sensory receptor cells (such as mechanoreceptors, photoreceptors, chemoreceptors, thermoreceptors) in sensory organs transduct sensory information from these organs towards the central nervous system, finally arriving at the sensory cortices in the brain, where sensory signals are processed and interpreted (perceived).

Sensory systems, or senses, are often divided into external (exteroception) and internal (interoception) sensory systems. Human external senses are based on the sensory organs of the eyes, ears, skin, nose, and mouth. Internal sensation detects stimuli from internal organs and tissues. Internal senses possessed by humans include spatial orientation, proprioception (body position) and nociception (pain). Further internal senses lead to signals such as hunger, thirst, suffocation, and nausea, or different involuntary behaviors, such as vomiting. Some animals are able to detect electrical and magnetic fields, air moisture, or polarized light, while others sense and perceive through alternative systems, such as echolocation.

Sensory modalities or sub modalities are different ways sensory information is encoded or transduced. Multimodality integrates different senses into one unified perceptual experience. For example, information from one sense has the potential to influence how information from another is perceived. Sensation and perception are studied by a variety of related fields, most notably psychophysics, neurobiology, cognitive psychology, and cognitive science.

== Definitions ==
=== Sensory organs ===
Sensory organs are organs that detect and transduce stimuli. Humans have sensory organs (i.e. eyes, ears, skin, nose, and mouth) that correspond to a respective visual (vision), auditory (hearing) and vestibular (balance), somatosensory (touch), olfactory (smell), and gustatory systems (taste). Internal sensation, or interoception, detects stimuli from internal organs and tissues. Humans have various internal sensory and perceptual systems, such as nociception, proprioception and equilibrioception. Chemoreception and osmoreception based sensory systems lead to various perceptions, such as hunger, thirst, suffocation, and nausea.

Nonhuman animals experience sensation and perception, with varying levels of similarity to and difference from humans and other animal species. For example, other mammals in general have a stronger sense of smell than humans. Some animal species lack one or more human sensory system analogues and some have sensory systems that are not found in humans, while others process and interpret the same sensory information in very different ways. For example, some animals are able to detect electrical fields and magnetic fields, air moisture, or polarized light. Others sense and perceive through alternative systems such as echolocation. Recent theory suggests that plants and artificial agents such as robots may be able to detect and interpret environmental information in an analogous manner to animals.

=== Sensory modalities ===
Sensory modality refers to the way that information is encoded, which is similar to the idea of transduction. The main sensory modalities can be described on the basis of how each is transduced. Listing all the different sensory modalities, which can number as many as 17, involves separating the major senses into more specific categories, or submodalities, of the larger sense. An individual sensory modality represents the sensation of a specific type of stimulus. For example, the general sensation and perception of touch, which is known as somatosensation, can be separated into light pressure, deep pressure, vibration, itch, pain, temperature, or hair movement, while the general sensation and perception of taste can be separated into submodalities of sweet, salty, sour, bitter, spicy, and umami, all of which are based on different chemicals binding to sensory neurons.

=== Receptors ===
Sensory receptors are the cells or structures that detect sensations. Stimuli in the environment activate specialized receptor cells in the peripheral nervous system. During transduction, physical stimulus is converted into action potential by receptors and transmitted towards the central nervous system for processing. Different types of stimuli are sensed by different types of receptor cells. Receptor cells can be classified into types on the basis of three different criteria: cell type, position, and function. Receptors can be classified structurally on the basis of cell type and their position in relation to stimuli they sense. Receptors can further be classified functionally on the basis of the transduction of stimuli, or how the mechanical stimulus, light, or chemical changed the cell membrane potential.

==== Structural receptor types ====
===== Location =====
One way to classify receptors is based on their location relative to the stimuli. An exteroceptor is a receptor that is located near a stimulus of the external environment, such as the somatosensory receptors that are located in the skin. An interoceptor is one that interprets stimuli from internal organs and tissues, such as the receptors that sense the increase in blood pressure in the aorta or carotid sinus.

===== Cell type =====
The cells that interpret information about the environment can be either (1) a neuron that has a free nerve ending, with dendrites embedded in tissue that would receive a sensation; (2) a neuron that has an encapsulated ending in which the sensory nerve endings are encapsulated in connective tissue that enhances their sensitivity; or (3) a specialized receptor cell, which has distinct structural components that interpret a specific type of stimulus. The pain and temperature receptors in the dermis of the skin are examples of neurons that have free nerve endings (1). Also located in the dermis of the skin are lamellated corpuscles, neurons with encapsulated nerve endings that respond to pressure and touch (2). The cells in the retina that respond to light stimuli are an example of a specialized receptor (3), a photoreceptor.

A transmembrane protein receptor is a protein in the cell membrane that mediates a physiological change in a neuron, most often through the opening of ion channels or changes in the cell signaling processes. Transmembrane receptors are activated by chemicals called ligands. For example, a molecule in food can serve as a ligand for taste receptors. Other transmembrane proteins, which are not accurately called receptors, are sensitive to mechanical or thermal changes. Physical changes in these proteins increase ion flow across the membrane, and can generate an action potential or a graded potential in the sensory neurons.

==== Functional receptor types ====
A third classification of receptors is by how the receptor transduces stimuli into membrane potential changes. Stimuli are of three general types. Some stimuli are ions and macromolecules that affect transmembrane receptor proteins when these chemicals diffuse across the cell membrane. Some stimuli are physical variations in the environment that affect receptor cell membrane potentials. Other stimuli include the electromagnetic radiation from visible light. For humans, the only electromagnetic energy that is perceived by our eyes is visible light. Some other organisms have receptors that humans lack, such as the heat sensors of snakes, the ultraviolet light sensors of bees, or magnetic receptors in migratory birds.

Receptor cells can be further categorized on the basis of the type of stimuli they transduce. The different types of functional receptor cell types are mechanoreceptors, photoreceptors, chemoreceptors (osmoreceptor), thermoreceptors, electroreceptors (in certain mammals and fish), and nociceptors. Physical stimuli, such as pressure and vibration, as well as the sensation of sound and body position (balance), are interpreted through a mechanoreceptor. Photoreceptors convert light (visible electromagnetic radiation) into signals. Chemical stimuli can be interpreted by a chemoreceptor that interprets chemical stimuli, such as an object's taste or smell, while osmoreceptors respond to a chemical solute concentrations of body fluids. Nociception (pain) interprets the presence of tissue damage, from sensory information from mechano-, chemo-, and thermoreceptors. Another physical stimulus that has its own type of receptor is temperature, which is sensed through a thermoreceptor that is either sensitive to temperatures above (heat) or below (cold) normal body temperature.

=== Thresholds ===
==== Absolute threshold ====
Each sense organ (eyes or nose, for instance) requires a minimal amount of stimulation in order to detect a stimulus. This minimum amount of stimulus is called the absolute threshold. The absolute threshold is defined as the minimum amount of stimulation necessary for the detection of a stimulus 50% of the time. Absolute threshold is measured by using a method called signal detection. This process involves presenting stimuli of varying intensities to a subject in order to determine the level at which the subject can reliably detect stimulation in a given sense.

==== Differential threshold ====
Differential threshold or just noticeable difference (JDS) is the smallest detectable difference between two stimuli, or the smallest difference in stimuli that can be judged to be different from each other. Weber's Law is an empirical law that states that the difference threshold is a constant fraction of the comparison stimulus. According to Weber's Law, bigger stimuli require larger differences to be noticed.

Human power exponents and Steven's Power Law

Magnitude estimation is a psychophysical method in which subjects assign perceived values of given stimuli. The relationship between stimulus intensity and perceptive intensity is described by Steven's power law.

=== Signal detection theory ===
Signal detection theory quantifies the experience of the subject to the presentation of a stimulus in the presence of noise. There is internal noise and there is external noise when it comes to signal detection. The internal noise originates from static in the nervous system. For example, an individual with closed eyes in a dark room still sees something—a blotchy pattern of grey with intermittent brighter flashes—this is internal noise. External noise is the result of noise in the environment that can interfere with the detection of the stimulus of interest. Noise is only a problem if the magnitude of the noise is large enough to interfere with signal collection. The nervous system calculates a criterion, or an internal threshold, for the detection of a signal in the presence of noise. If a signal is judged to be above the criterion, thus the signal is differentiated from the noise, the signal is sensed and perceived. Errors in signal detection can potentially lead to false positives and false negatives. The sensory criterion might be shifted based on the importance of the detecting the signal. Shifting of the criterion may influence the likelihood of false positives and false negatives.

=== Private perceptive experience ===
Subjective visual and auditory experiences appear to be similar across humans subjects. The same cannot be said about taste. For example, there is a molecule called propylthiouracil (PROP) that some humans experience as bitter, some as almost tasteless, while others experience it as somewhere between tasteless and bitter. There is a genetic basis for this difference between perception given the same sensory stimulus. This subjective difference in taste perception has implications for individuals' food preferences, and consequently, health.

=== Sensory adaptation and habituation ===
Sensory adaptation has a similar meaning to habituation, though sensory adaptation generally refers to the actual decreased sensitivity of one's sensory organs, whereas habituation occurs in the deeper part of the nervous system too as it filters out information; as in, it is not just sensory adaptation or fatigue to sensory input. When a stimulus is constant and unchanging, perceptual sensory adaptation occurs. During that process, the subject becomes less sensitive to the stimulus. Whereas habituation is mainly thought to form from reflex arc changes. Habituation also occurs in some microorganisms.

=== Fourier analysis ===
Biological auditory (hearing), vestibular and spatial, and visual systems (vision) appear to break down real-world complex stimuli into sine wave components, through the mathematical process called Fourier analysis. Many neurons have a strong preference for certain sine frequency components in contrast to others. The way that simpler sounds and images are encoded during sensation can provide insight into how perception of real-world objects happens.

=== Sensory neuroscience and the biology of perception ===
Perception occurs when nerves that lead from the sensory organs (e.g. eye) to the brain are stimulated, even if that stimulation is unrelated to the target signal of the sensory organ. For example, in the case of the eye, it does not matter whether light or something else stimulates the optic nerve; that stimulation will result in visual perception, even if there was no visual stimulus to begin with. (A human can prove this point to themself by closing their eyes—preferably in a dark environment—and pressing gently on the outside corner of one eye through the eyelid. They will see a visual spot toward the inside of their visual field, near their nose.)

==== Sensory nervous system ====
All stimuli received by the receptors are transduced to an action potential, which is carried along one or more afferent neurons towards a specific area (cortex) of the brain. Just as different nerves are dedicated to sensory and motors tasks, different areas of the brain (cortices) are similarly dedicated to different sensory and perceptual tasks. More complex processing is accomplished across primary cortical regions that spread beyond the primary cortices. Every nerve, sensory or motor, has its own signal transmission speed. For example, nerves in the frog's legs have a 90 ft/s (99 km/h) signal transmission speed, while sensory nerves in humans, transmit sensory information at speeds between 165 ft/s (181 km/h) and 330 ft/s (362 km/h).

The human sensory and perceptual system
Number	Physical stimulus	Sensory organ	Sensory system	Cranial nerve(s)	Cerebral cortex	Primary associated perception(s)	Name
1	Light	Eyes	Visual system	Optic (II)	Visual cortex	Visual perception	Sight (vision)
2	Sound	Ears	Auditory system	Vestibulocochlear (VIII)	Auditory cortex	Auditory perception	Hearing (audition)
3	Gravity and acceleration	Inner ear	Vestibular system	Vestibulocochlear (VIII)	Vestibular cortex	Equilibrioception	Balance (equilibrium)
4	Chemical substance	Nose	Olfactory system	Olfactory (I)	Olfactory cortex	Olfactory perception, gustatory perception (taste or flavor)	Smell (olfaction)
5	Chemical substance	Mouth	Gustatory system	Facial (VII), glossopharyngeal (IX)	Gustatory cortex	Gustatory perception (taste or flavor)	Taste (gustation)
6	Position, motion, temperature	Skin	Somatosensory system	Trigeminal (V), glossopharyngeal (IX) + spinal nerves	Somatosensory cortex	Tactile perception (mechanoreception, thermoception)	Touch (tactition)

=== Multimodal perception ===
Perceptual experience is often multimodal. Multimodality integrates different senses into one unified perceptual experience. Information from one sense has the potential to influence how information from another is perceived. Multimodal perception is qualitatively different from unimodal perception. There has been a growing body of evidence since the mid-1990s on the neural correlates of multimodal perception.

=== Philosophy ===
The philosophy of perception is concerned with the nature of perceptual experience and the status of perceptual data, in particular how they relate to beliefs about, or knowledge of, the world. Historical inquiries into the underlying mechanisms of sensation and perception have led early researchers to subscribe to various philosophical interpretations of perception and the mind, including panpsychism, dualism, and materialism. The majority of modern scientists who study sensation and perception take on a materialistic view of the mind.

== Human sensation ==
=== General ===
==== Multimodal perception ====
Humans respond more strongly to multimodal stimuli compared to the sum of each single modality together, an effect called the superadditive effect of multisensory integration. Neurons that respond to both visual and auditory stimuli have been identified in the superior temporal sulcus. Additionally, multimodal "what" and "where" pathways have been proposed for auditory and tactile stimuli.

=== External ===
External receptors that respond to stimuli from outside the body are called exteroceptors. Human external sensation is based on the sensory organs of the eyes, ears, skin, vestibular system, nose, and mouth, which contribute, respectively, to the sensory perceptions of vision, hearing, touch, balance, smell, and taste. Smell and taste are both responsible for identifying molecules and thus both are types of chemoreceptors. Both olfaction (smell) and gustation (taste) require the transduction of chemical stimuli into electrical potentials.

==== Visual system (vision) ====
The visual system, or sense of sight, is based on the transduction of light stimuli received through the eyes and contributes to visual perception. The visual system detects light on photoreceptors in the retina of each eye that generates electrical nerve impulses for the perception of varying colors and brightness. There are two types of photoreceptors: rods and cones. Rods are very sensitive to light but do not distinguish colors. Cones distinguish colors but are less sensitive to dim light.

At the molecular level, visual stimuli cause changes in the photopigment molecule that lead to changes in membrane potential of the photoreceptor cell. A single unit of light is called a photon, which is described in physics as a packet of energy with properties of both a particle and a wave. The energy of a photon is represented by its wavelength, with each wavelength of visible light corresponding to a particular color. Visible light is electromagnetic radiation with a wavelength between 380 and 720 nm. Wavelengths of electromagnetic radiation longer than 720 nm fall into the infrared range, whereas wavelengths shorter than 380 nm fall into the ultraviolet range. Light with a wavelength of 380 nm is blue whereas light with a wavelength of 720 nm is dark red. All other colors fall between red and blue at various points along the wavelength scale.

The three types of cone opsins, being sensitive to different wavelengths of light, provide us with color vision. By comparing the activity of the three different cones, the brain can extract color information from visual stimuli. For example, a bright blue light that has a wavelength of approximately 450 nm would activate the "red" cones minimally, the "green" cones marginally, and the "blue" cones predominantly. The relative activation of the three different cones is calculated by the brain, which perceives the color as blue. However, cones cannot react to low-intensity light, and rods do not sense the color of light. Therefore, our low-light vision is—in essence—in grayscale. In other words, in a dark room, everything appears as a shade of gray. If you think that you can see colors in the dark, it is most likely because your brain knows what color something is and is relying on that memory.

There is some disagreement as to whether the visual system consists of one, two, or three submodalities. Neuroanatomists generally regard it as two submodalities, given that different receptors are responsible for the perception of color and brightness. Some argue that stereopsis, the perception of depth using both eyes, also constitutes a sense, but it is generally regarded as a cognitive (that is, post-sensory) function of the visual cortex of the brain where patterns and objects in images are recognized and interpreted based on previously learned information. This is called visual memory.

The inability to see is called blindness. Blindness may result from damage to the eyeball, especially to the retina, damage to the optic nerve that connects each eye to the brain, and/or from stroke (infarcts in the brain). Temporary or permanent blindness can be caused by poisons or medications. People who are blind from degradation or damage to the visual cortex, but still have functional eyes, are actually capable of some level of vision and reaction to visual stimuli but not a conscious perception; this is known as blindsight. People with blindsight are usually not aware that they are reacting to visual sources, and instead just unconsciously adapt their behavior to the stimulus.

On February 14, 2013, researchers developed a neural implant that gives rats the ability to sense infrared light which for the first time provides living creatures with new abilities, instead of simply replacing or augmenting existing abilities.

===== Visual perception in psychology =====
According to Gestalt psychology, people perceive the whole of something even if it is not there. The Gestalt's Law of Organization states that people have seven factors that help to group what is seen into patterns or groups: Common Fate, Similarity, Proximity, Closure, Symmetry, Continuity, and Past Experience.

- The Law of Common fate says that objects are led along the smoothest path. People follow the trend of motion as the lines/dots flow.
- The Law of Similarity refers to the grouping of images or objects that are similar to each other in some aspect. This could be due to shade, colour, size, shape, or other qualities you could distinguish.
- The Law of Proximity states that our minds like to group based on how close objects are to each other. We may see 42 objects in a group, but we can also perceive three groups of two lines with seven objects in each line.
- The Law of Closure is the idea that we as humans still see a full picture even if there are gaps within that picture. There could be gaps or parts missing from a section of a shape, but we would still perceive the shape as whole.
- The Law of Symmetry refers to a person's preference to see symmetry around a central point. An example would be when we use parentheses in writing. We tend to perceive all of the words in the parentheses as one section instead of individual words within the parentheses.
- The Law of Continuity tells us that objects are grouped together by their elements and then perceived as a whole. This usually happens when we see overlapping objects. We will see the overlapping objects with no interruptions.
- The Law of Past Experience refers to the tendency humans have to categorize objects according to past experiences under certain circumstances. If two objects are usually perceived together or within close proximity of each other the Law of Past Experience is usually seen.

==== Auditory system (hearing) ====
Hearing, or audition, is the transduction of sound waves into a neural signal that is made possible by the structures of the ear. The large, fleshy structure on the lateral aspect of the head is known as the auricle. At the end of the auditory canal is the tympanic membrane, or ear drum, which vibrates after it is struck by sound waves. The auricle, ear canal, and tympanic membrane are often referred to as the external ear. The middle ear consists of a space spanned by three small bones called the ossicles. The three ossicles are the malleus, incus, and stapes, which are Latin names that roughly translate to hammer, anvil, and stirrup. The malleus is attached to the tympanic membrane and articulates with the incus. The incus, in turn, articulates with the stapes. The stapes is then attached to the inner ear, where the sound waves will be transduced into a neural signal. The middle ear is connected to the pharynx through the Eustachian tube, which helps equilibrate air pressure across the tympanic membrane. The tube is normally closed but will pop open when the muscles of the pharynx contract during swallowing or yawning.

Mechanoreceptors turn motion into electrical nerve pulses, which are located in the inner ear. Since sound is vibration, propagating through a medium such as air, the detection of these vibrations, that is the sense of the hearing, is a mechanical sense because these vibrations are mechanically conducted from the eardrum through a series of tiny bones to hair-like fibers in the inner ear, which detect mechanical motion of the fibers within a range of about 20 to 20,000 hertz, with substantial variation between individuals. Hearing at high frequencies declines with an increase in age. Inability to hear is called deafness or hearing impairment. Sound can also be detected as vibrations conducted through the body. Lower frequencies that can be heard are detected this way. Some deaf people are able to determine the direction and location of vibrations picked up through the feet.

Studies pertaining to audition started to increase in number towards the latter end of the nineteenth century. During this time, many laboratories in the United States began to create new models, diagrams, and instruments that all pertained to the ear.

Auditory cognitive psychology is a branch of cognitive psychology that is dedicated to the auditory system. The main point is to understand why humans are able to use sound in thinking outside of actually saying it. Relating to auditory cognitive psychology is psychoacoustics. Psychoacoustics is more directed at people interested in music. Haptics, a word used to refer to both taction and kinesthesia, has many parallels with psychoacoustics. Most research around these two are focused on the instrument, the listener, and the player of the instrument.

==== Somatosensory system (touch) ====
Somatosensation is considered a general sense, as opposed to the special senses discussed in this section. Somatosensation is the group of sensory modalities that are associated with touch and interoception. The modalities of somatosensation include pressure, vibration, light touch, tickle, itch, temperature, pain, kinesthesia. Somatosensation, also called tactition (adjectival form: tactile) is a perception resulting from activation of neural receptors, generally in the skin including hair follicles, but also in the tongue, throat, and mucosa. A variety of pressure receptors respond to variations in pressure (firm, brushing, sustained, etc.). The touch sense of itching caused by insect bites or allergies involves special itch-specific neurons in the skin and spinal cord. The loss or impairment of the ability to feel anything touched is called tactile anesthesia. Paresthesia is a sensation of tingling, pricking, or numbness of the skin that may result from nerve damage and may be permanent or temporary.

Two types of somatosensory signals that are transduced by free nerve endings are pain and temperature. These two modalities use thermoreceptors and nociceptors to transduce temperature and pain stimuli, respectively. Temperature receptors are stimulated when local temperatures differ from body temperature. Some thermoreceptors are sensitive to just cold and others to just heat. Nociception is the sensation of potentially damaging stimuli. Mechanical, chemical, or thermal stimuli beyond a set threshold will elicit painful sensations. Stressed or damaged tissues release chemicals that activate receptor proteins in the nociceptors. For example, the sensation of heat associated with spicy foods involves capsaicin, the active molecule in hot peppers.

Low frequency vibrations are sensed by mechanoreceptors called Merkel cells, also known as type I cutaneous mechanoreceptors. Merkel cells are located in the stratum basale of the epidermis. Deep pressure and vibration is transduced by lamellated (Pacinian) corpuscles, which are receptors with encapsulated endings found deep in the dermis, or subcutaneous tissue. Light touch is transduced by the encapsulated endings known as tactile (Meissner) corpuscles. Follicles are also wrapped in a plexus of nerve endings known as the hair follicle plexus. These nerve endings detect the movement of hair at the surface of the skin, such as when an insect may be walking along the skin. Stretching of the skin is transduced by stretch receptors known as bulbous corpuscles. Bulbous corpuscles are also known as Ruffini corpuscles, or type II cutaneous mechanoreceptors.

The heat receptors are sensitive to infrared radiation and can occur in specialized organs, for instance in pit vipers. The thermoceptors in the skin are quite different from the homeostatic thermoceptors in the brain (hypothalamus), which provide feedback on internal body temperature.

==== Gustatory system (taste) ====
The gustatory system or the sense of taste is the sensory system that is partially responsible for the perception of taste (flavor). A few recognized submodalities exist within taste: sweet, salty, sour, bitter, and umami. Very recent research has suggested that there may also be a sixth taste submodality for fats, or lipids. The sense of taste is often confused with the perception of flavor, which is the results of the multimodal integration of gustatory (taste) and olfactory (smell) sensations.

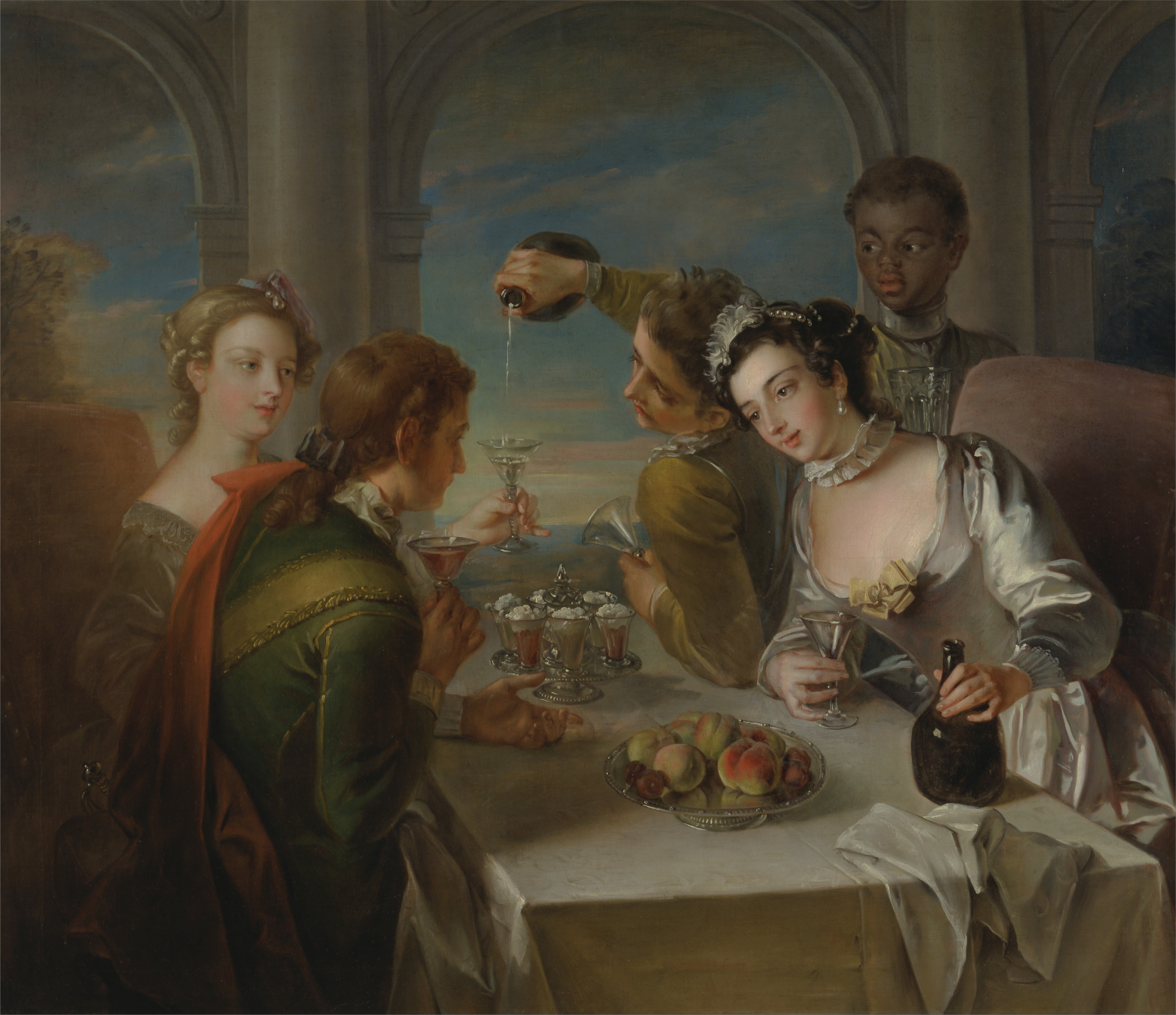
The Sense of Taste by Philippe Mercier c. 1744–1747

Within the structure of the lingual papillae are taste buds that contain specialized gustatory receptor cells for the transduction of taste stimuli. These receptor cells are sensitive to the chemicals contained within foods that are ingested, and they release neurotransmitters based on the amount of the chemical in the food. Neurotransmitters from the gustatory cells can activate sensory neurons in the facial, glossopharyngeal, and vagus cranial nerves.

Salty and sour taste submodalities are triggered by the cations Na^{+} and H^{+}, respectively. The other taste modalities result from food molecules binding to a G protein–coupled receptor. A G protein signal transduction system ultimately leads to depolarization of the gustatory cell. The sweet taste is the sensitivity of gustatory cells to the presence of glucose (or sugar substitutes) dissolved in the saliva. Bitter taste is similar to sweet in that food molecules bind to G protein–coupled receptors. The taste known as umami is often referred to as the savory taste. Like sweet and bitter, it is based on the activation of G protein–coupled receptors by a specific molecule.

Once the gustatory cells are activated by the taste molecules, they release neurotransmitters onto the dendrites of sensory neurons. These neurons are part of the facial and glossopharyngeal cranial nerves, as well as a component within the vagus nerve dedicated to the gag reflex. The facial nerve connects to taste buds in the anterior third of the tongue. The glossopharyngeal nerve connects to taste buds in the posterior two thirds of the tongue. The vagus nerve connects to taste buds in the extreme posterior of the tongue, verging on the pharynx, which are more sensitive to noxious stimuli such as bitterness.

Flavor depends on odor, texture, and temperature as well as on taste. Humans receive tastes through sensory organs called taste buds, or gustatory calyculi, concentrated on the upper surface of the tongue. Other tastes such as calcium and free fatty acids may also be basic tastes but have yet to receive widespread acceptance. The inability to taste is called ageusia.

There is a rare phenomenon when it comes to the gustatory sense. It is called lexical–gustatory synesthesia. Lexical–gustatory synesthesia is when people can "taste" words. They have reported having flavor sensations they are not actually eating. When they read words, hear words, or even imagine words. They have reported not only simple flavors, but textures, complex flavors, and temperatures as well.

==== Olfactory system (smell) ====
Like the sense of taste, the sense of smell, or the olfactory system, is also responsive to chemical stimuli. Unlike taste, there are hundreds of olfactory receptors (388 functional ones according to one 2003 study), each binding to a particular molecular feature. Odor molecules possess a variety of features and, thus, excite specific receptors more or less strongly. This combination of excitatory signals from different receptors makes up what humans perceive as the molecule's smell.

The olfactory receptor neurons are located in a small region within the superior nasal cavity. This region is referred to as the olfactory epithelium and contains bipolar sensory neurons. Each olfactory sensory neuron has dendrites that extend from the apical surface of the epithelium into the mucus lining the cavity. As airborne molecules are inhaled through the nose, they pass over the olfactory epithelial region and dissolve into the mucus. These odorant molecules bind to proteins that keep them dissolved in the mucus and help transport them to the olfactory dendrites. The odorant–protein complex binds to a receptor protein within the cell membrane of an olfactory dendrite. These receptors are G protein–coupled, and will produce a graded membrane potential in the olfactory neurons.

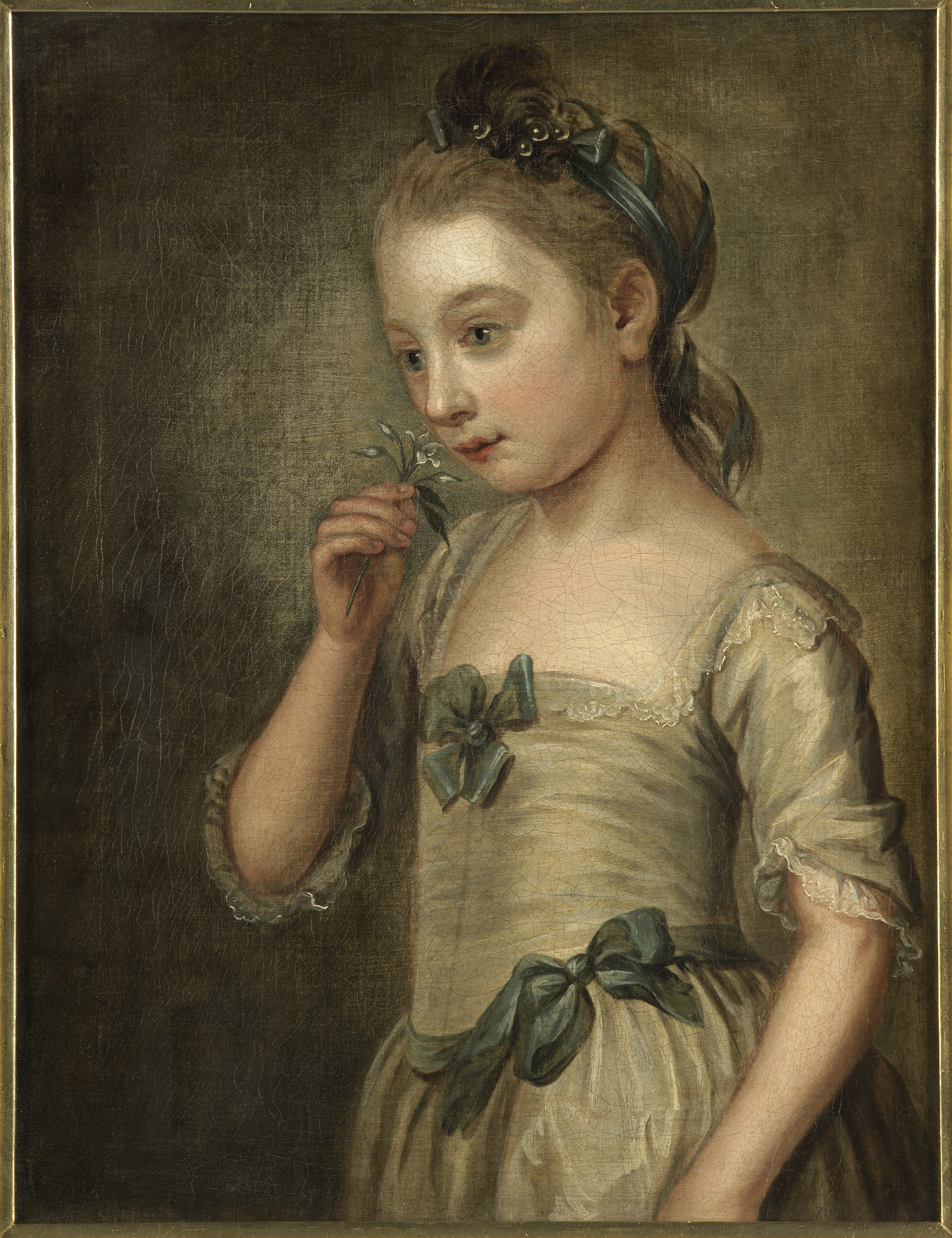
The sense of smell. Bequest of Mrs E.G. Elgar, 1945 Museum of New Zealand Te Papa Tongarewa.

In the brain, olfaction is processed by the olfactory cortex. Olfactory receptor neurons in the nose differ from most other neurons in that they die and regenerate on a regular basis. The inability to smell is called anosmia. Some neurons in the nose are specialized to detect pheromones. Loss of the sense of smell can result in food tasting bland. A person with an impaired sense of smell may require additional spice and seasoning levels for food to be tasted. Anosmia may also be related to some presentations of mild depression, because the loss of enjoyment of food may lead to a general sense of despair. The ability of olfactory neurons to replace themselves decreases with age, leading to age-related anosmia. This explains why some elderly people salt their food more than younger people do.

==== Vestibular system (balance) ====
The vestibular sense, or sense of balance (equilibrium), is the sense that contributes to the perception of balance (equilibrium), spatial orientation, direction, or acceleration (equilibrioception). Along with audition, the inner ear is responsible for encoding information about equilibrium. A similar mechanoreceptor—a hair cell with stereocilia—senses head position, head movement, and whether our bodies are in motion. These cells are located within the vestibule of the inner ear. Head position is sensed by the utricle and saccule, whereas head movement is sensed by the semicircular canals. The neural signals generated in the vestibular ganglion are transmitted through the vestibulocochlear nerve to the brain stem and cerebellum.

The semicircular canals are three ring-like extensions of the vestibule. One is oriented in the horizontal plane, whereas the other two are oriented in the vertical plane. The anterior and posterior vertical canals are oriented at approximately 45 degrees relative to the sagittal plane. The base of each semicircular canal, where it meets with the vestibule, connects to an enlarged region known as the ampulla. The ampulla contains the hair cells that respond to rotational movement, such as turning the head while saying "no". The stereocilia of these hair cells extend into the cupula, a membrane that attaches to the top of the ampulla. As the head rotates in a plane parallel to the semicircular canal, the fluid lags, deflecting the cupula in the direction opposite to the head movement. The semicircular canals contain several ampullae, with some oriented horizontally and others oriented vertically. By comparing the relative movements of both the horizontal and vertical ampullae, the vestibular system can detect the direction of most head movements within three-dimensional (3D) space.

The vestibular nerve conducts information from sensory receptors in three ampullae that sense motion of fluid in three semicircular canals caused by three-dimensional rotation of the head. The vestibular nerve also conducts information from the utricle and the saccule, which contain hair-like sensory receptors that bend under the weight of otoliths (which are small crystals of calcium carbonate) that provide the inertia needed to detect head rotation, linear acceleration, and the direction of gravitational force.

=== Internal ===
An internal sensation and perception also known as interoception is "any sense that is normally stimulated from within the body". These involve numerous sensory receptors in internal organs. Interoception is thought to be atypical in clinical conditions such as alexithymia. Specific receptors include:

1. Hunger is governed by a set of brain structures (e.g., the hypothalamus) that are responsible for energy homeostasis.
2. Pulmonary stretch receptors are found in the lungs and control the respiratory rate.
3. Peripheral chemoreceptors in the brain monitor the carbon dioxide and oxygen levels in the brain to give a perception of suffocation if carbon dioxide levels get too high.
4. The chemoreceptor trigger zone is an area of the medulla in the brain that receives inputs from blood-borne drugs or hormones, and communicates with the vomiting center.
5. Chemoreceptors in the circulatory system also measure salt levels and prompt thirst if they get too high; they can also respond to high blood sugar levels in diabetics.
6. Cutaneous receptors in the skin not only respond to touch, pressure, temperature and vibration, but also respond to vasodilation in the skin such as blushing.
7. Stretch receptors in the gastrointestinal tract sense gas distension that may result in colic pain.
8. Stimulation of sensory receptors in the esophagus result in sensations felt in the throat when swallowing, vomiting, or during acid reflux.
9. Sensory receptors in pharynx mucosa, similar to touch receptors in the skin, sense foreign objects such as mucus and food that may result in a gag reflex and corresponding gagging sensation.
10. Stimulation of sensory receptors in the urinary bladder and rectum may result in perceptions of fullness.
11. Stimulation of stretch sensors that sense dilation of various blood vessels may result in pain, for example headache caused by vasodilation of brain arteries.
12. Cardioception refers to the perception of the activity of the heart.
13. Opsins and direct DNA damage in melanocytes and keratinocytes can sense ultraviolet radiation, which plays a role in pigmentation and sunburn.
14. Baroreceptors relay blood pressure information to the brain and maintain proper homeostatic blood pressure.

The perception of time is also sometimes called a sense, though not tied to a specific receptor.

== Non-human animal sensation and perception ==
=== Human analogues ===
Other living organisms have receptors to sense the world around them, including many of the senses listed above for humans. However, the mechanisms and capabilities vary widely.

==== Smell ====
An example of smell in non-mammals is that of sharks, which combine their keen sense of smell with timing to determine the direction of a smell. They follow the nostril that first detected the smell. Insects have olfactory receptors on their antennae. Although it is unknown to the degree and magnitude which non-human mammals can smell better than humans, humans are known to have far fewer olfactory receptors than mice, and humans have also accumulated more genetic mutations in their olfactory receptors than other primates.

==== Vomeronasal organ ====
Many animals (salamanders, reptiles, mammals) have a vomeronasal organ that is connected with the mouth cavity. In mammals, it is mainly used to detect pheromones of marked territory, trails, and sexual state. Reptiles like snakes and monitor lizards make extensive use of it as a smelling organ by transferring scent molecules to the vomeronasal organ with the tips of the forked tongue. In reptiles, the vomeronasal organ is commonly referred to as Jacobson's organ. In mammals, it is often associated with a special behavior called flehmen characterized by uplifting of the lips. The organ is believed vestigial in humans, because associated neurons have not been found that give any sensory input in humans.

==== Taste ====
Flies and butterflies have taste organs on their feet, allowing them to taste anything they land on. Catfish have taste organs across their entire bodies, and can taste anything they touch, including chemicals in the water.

==== Vision ====
Cats have the ability to see in low light, which is due to muscles surrounding their irides—which contract and expand their pupils—as well as to the tapetum lucidum, a reflective membrane that optimizes the image. Pit vipers, pythons and some boas have organs that allow them to detect infrared light, such that these snakes are able to sense the body heat of their prey. The common vampire bat may also have an infrared sensor on its nose. It has been found that birds and some other animals are tetrachromats and have the ability to see in the ultraviolet down to 300 nanometers. Bees and dragonflies are also able to see in the ultraviolet. Mantis shrimps can perceive both polarized light and multispectral images and have twelve distinct kinds of color receptors, unlike humans which have three kinds and most mammals which have two kinds.

Cephalopods have the ability to change color using chromatophores in their skin. Researchers believe that opsins in the skin can sense different wavelengths of light and help the creatures choose a coloration that camouflages them, in addition to light input from the eyes. Other researchers hypothesize that cephalopod eyes in species which only have a single photoreceptor protein may use chromatic aberration to turn monochromatic vision into color vision, explaining pupils shaped like the letter U, the letter W, or a dumbbell, as well as explaining the need for colorful mating displays. Some cephalopods can also distinguish the polarization of light.

==== Spatial orientation ====
Many invertebrates have a statocyst, which is a sensor for acceleration and orientation that works very differently from the mammalian's semicircular canals.

=== Non-human analogues ===
In addition, some animals have senses that humans lack.

==== Magnetoception ====
Magnetoception (or magnetoreception) is the ability to detect the direction one is facing based on the Earth's magnetic field. Directional awareness is most commonly observed in birds, which rely on their magnetic sense to navigate during migration. It has also been observed in insects such as bees. Cattle make use of magnetoception to align themselves in a north–south direction. Magnetotactic bacteria build miniature magnets inside themselves and use them to determine their orientation relative to the Earth's magnetic field. There has been some recent (tentative) research suggesting that the rhodopsin in the human eye, which responds particularly well to blue light, can facilitate magnetoception in humans.

==== Echolocation ====
Certain animals, including bats and cetaceans, have the ability to determine orientation to other objects through interpretation of reflected sound (like sonar). They most often use this to navigate through poor lighting conditions or to identify and track prey. There is currently an uncertainty whether this is simply an extremely developed post-sensory interpretation of auditory perceptions or it actually constitutes a separate sense. Resolution of the issue will require brain scans of animals while they actually perform echolocation, a task that has proven difficult in practice.

Blind people report they are able to navigate and in some cases identify an object by interpreting reflected sounds (especially their own footsteps), a phenomenon known as human echolocation.

==== Electroreception ====
Electroreception (or electroception) is the ability to detect electric fields. Several species of fish, sharks, and rays have the capacity to sense changes in electric fields in their immediate vicinity. For cartilaginous fish this occurs through a specialized organ called the ampullae of Lorenzini. Some fish passively sense changing nearby electric fields; some generate their own weak electric fields, and sense the pattern of field potentials over their body surface; and some use these electric field generating and sensing capacities for social communication. The mechanisms by which electroceptive fish construct a spatial representation from very small differences in field potentials involve comparisons of spike latencies from different parts of the fish's body.

The only orders of mammals that are known to demonstrate electroception are the dolphin and monotreme orders. Among these mammals, the platypus has the most acute sense of electroception.

A dolphin can detect electric fields in water using electroreceptors in vibrissal crypts arrayed in pairs on its snout and which evolved from whisker motion sensors. These electroreceptors can detect electric fields as weak as 4.6 microvolts per centimeter, such as those generated by contracting muscles and pumping gills of potential prey. This permits the dolphin to locate prey from the seafloor where sediment limits visibility and echolocation.

Spiders have been shown to detect electric fields to determine a suitable time to extend web for 'ballooning'.

Body modification enthusiasts have experimented with magnetic implants to attempt to replicate this sense. However, in general humans (and it is presumed other mammals) can detect electric fields only indirectly by detecting the effect they have on hairs. An electrically charged balloon, for instance, will exert a force on human arm hairs, which can be felt through tactition and identified as coming from a static charge (and not from wind or the like). This is not electroreception, as it is a post-sensory cognitive action.

==== Hygroreception ====
Hygroreception is the ability to detect changes in the moisture content of the environment.

==== Infrared sensing ====
The ability to sense infrared thermal radiation evolved independently in various families of snakes. Essentially, it allows these reptiles to "see" radiant heat at wavelengths between 5 and 30 μm to a degree of accuracy such that a blind rattlesnake can target vulnerable body parts of the prey at which it strikes. It was previously thought that the organs evolved primarily as prey detectors, but it is now believed that it may also be used in thermoregulatory decision making. The facial pit underwent parallel evolution in pitvipers and some boas and pythons, having evolved once in pitvipers and multiple times in boas and pythons. The electrophysiology of the structure is similar between the two lineages, but they differ in gross structural anatomy. Most superficially, pitvipers possess one large pit organ on either side of the head, between the eye and the nostril (loreal pit), while boas and pythons have three or more comparatively smaller pits lining the upper and sometimes the lower lip, in or between the scales. Those of the pitvipers are the more advanced, having a suspended sensory membrane as opposed to a simple pit structure. Within the family Viperidae, the pit organ is seen only in the subfamily Crotalinae: the pitvipers. The organ is used extensively to detect and target endothermic prey such as rodents and birds, and it was previously assumed that the organ evolved specifically for that purpose. However, recent evidence shows that the pit organ may also be used for thermoregulation. According to Krochmal et al., pitvipers can use their pits for thermoregulatory decision-making while true vipers (vipers who do not contain heat-sensing pits) cannot.

In spite of its detection of IR light, the pits' IR detection mechanism is not similar to photoreceptors—while photoreceptors detect light via photochemical reactions, the protein in the pits of snakes is in fact a temperature-sensitive ion channel. It senses infrared signals through a mechanism involving warming of the pit organ, rather than a chemical reaction to light. This is consistent with the thin pit membrane, which allows incoming IR radiation to quickly and precisely warm a given ion channel and trigger a nerve impulse, as well as vascularize the pit membrane in order to rapidly cool the ion channel back to its original "resting" or "inactive" temperature.

==== Other ====
Pressure detection uses the organ of Weber, a system consisting of three appendages of vertebrae transferring changes in shape of the gas bladder to the middle ear. It can be used to regulate the buoyancy of the fish. Fish like the weather fish and other loaches are also known to respond to low pressure areas but they lack a swim bladder.

Current detection is a detection system of water currents, consisting mostly of vortices, found in the lateral line of fish and aquatic forms of amphibians. The lateral line is also sensitive to low-frequency vibrations (typically best attuned to 20–50 hertz; it could generally detect frequencies from around 0–200 hertz). The mechanoreceptors are hair cells, the same mechanoreceptors for vestibular sense and hearing. It is used primarily for navigation, hunting, and schooling. The receptors of the electrical sense are modified hair cells of the lateral line system.

Polarized light direction/detection is used by bees to orient themselves, especially on cloudy days. Cuttlefish, some beetles, and mantis shrimp can also perceive the polarization of light. Most sighted humans can in fact learn to roughly detect large areas of polarization by an effect called Haidinger's brush; however, this is considered an entoptic phenomenon rather than a separate sense.

Slit sensillae of spiders detect mechanical strain in the exoskeleton, providing information on force and vibrations.

== Plant sensation ==
By using a variety of sense receptors, plants sense light, temperature, humidity, chemical substances, chemical gradients, reorientation, magnetic fields, infections, tissue damage and mechanical pressure. The absence of a nervous system notwithstanding, plants interpret and respond to these stimuli by a variety of hormonal and cell-to-cell communication pathways that result in movement, morphological changes and physiological state alterations at the organism level, that is, result in plant behavior. Plants might be able to emit airborne sounds similar to "screaming" when stressed. Those noises could not be detectable by human ears, but organisms with a hearing range that can hear ultrasonic frequencies—like mice, bats or perhaps other plants—could hear the plants' cries from as far as 15 feet (4.6 m) away. Plants might also respond defensively, such as by producing more mustard oil, when they detect high-frequency vibrations commonly produced by some herbivorous insects.

Such physiological and cognitive functions are generally not believed to give rise to mental phenomena or qualia, however, as these are typically considered the product of nervous system activity. The emergence of mental phenomena from the activity of systems functionally or computationally analogous to that of nervous systems is, however, a hypothetical possibility explored by some schools of thought in the philosophy of mind field, such as functionalism and computationalism.

== Artificial sensation and perception ==
Machine perception is the capability of a computer system to interpret data in a manner that is similar to the way humans use their senses to relate to the world around them. Computers take in and respond to their environment through attached hardware. Until recently, input was limited to a keyboard, joystick or a mouse, but advances in technology, both in hardware and software, have allowed computers to take in sensory input in a way similar to humans.

== Culture ==
In the time of William Shakespeare, there were commonly reckoned to be five wits or five senses. At that time, the words "sense" and "wit" were synonyms, so the senses were known as the five outward wits. (This traditional concept of five senses is still common to this day.) Depictions of the five traditional senses as allegory became a popular subject for seventeenth-century artists, especially among Dutch and Flemish Baroque painters. A typical example is Gérard de Lairesse's Allegory of the Five Senses (1668), in which each of the figures in the main group alludes to a sense: Sight is the reclining boy with a convex mirror, hearing is the cupid-like boy with a triangle, smell is represented by the girl with flowers, taste is represented by the woman with the fruit, and touch is represented by the woman holding the bird.

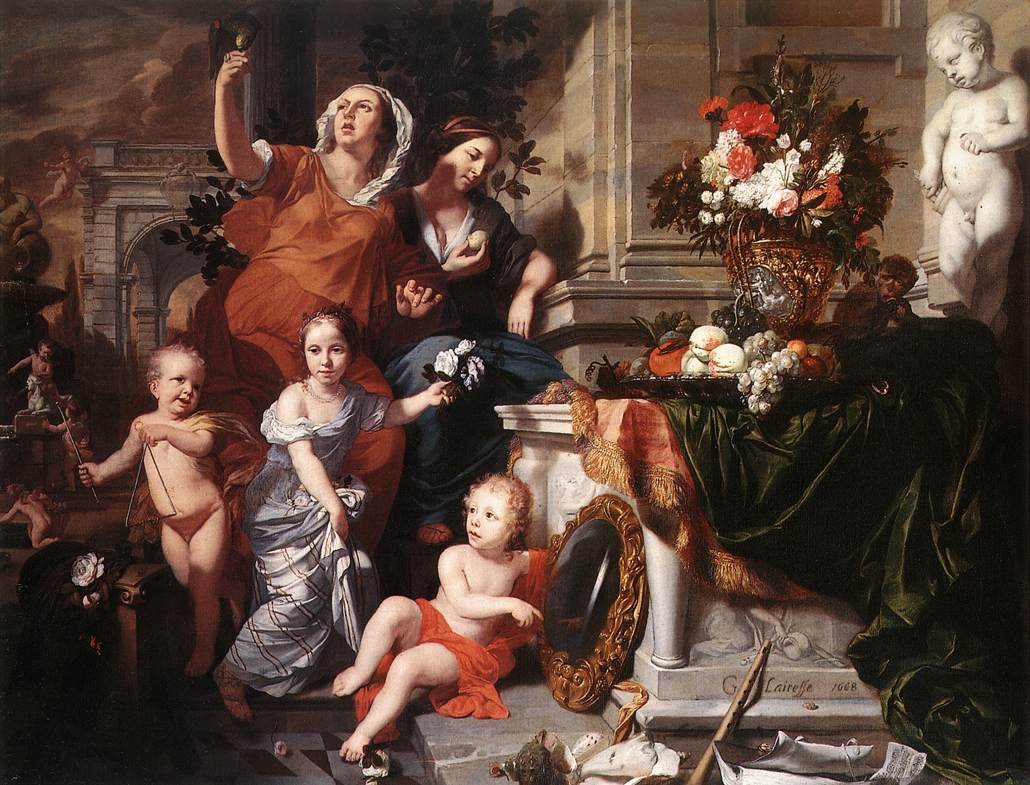
Lairesse's Allegory of the Five Senses, 1668

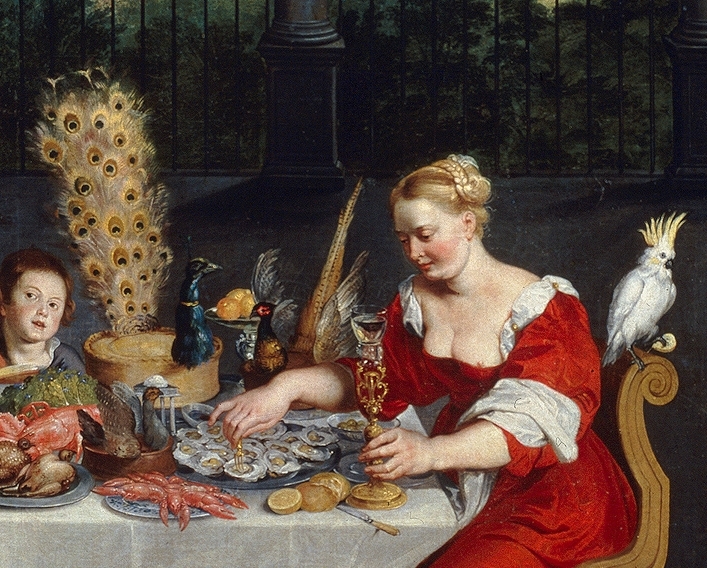
Detail of The Senses of Hearing, Touch and Taste, Jan Brueghel the Elder, 1618

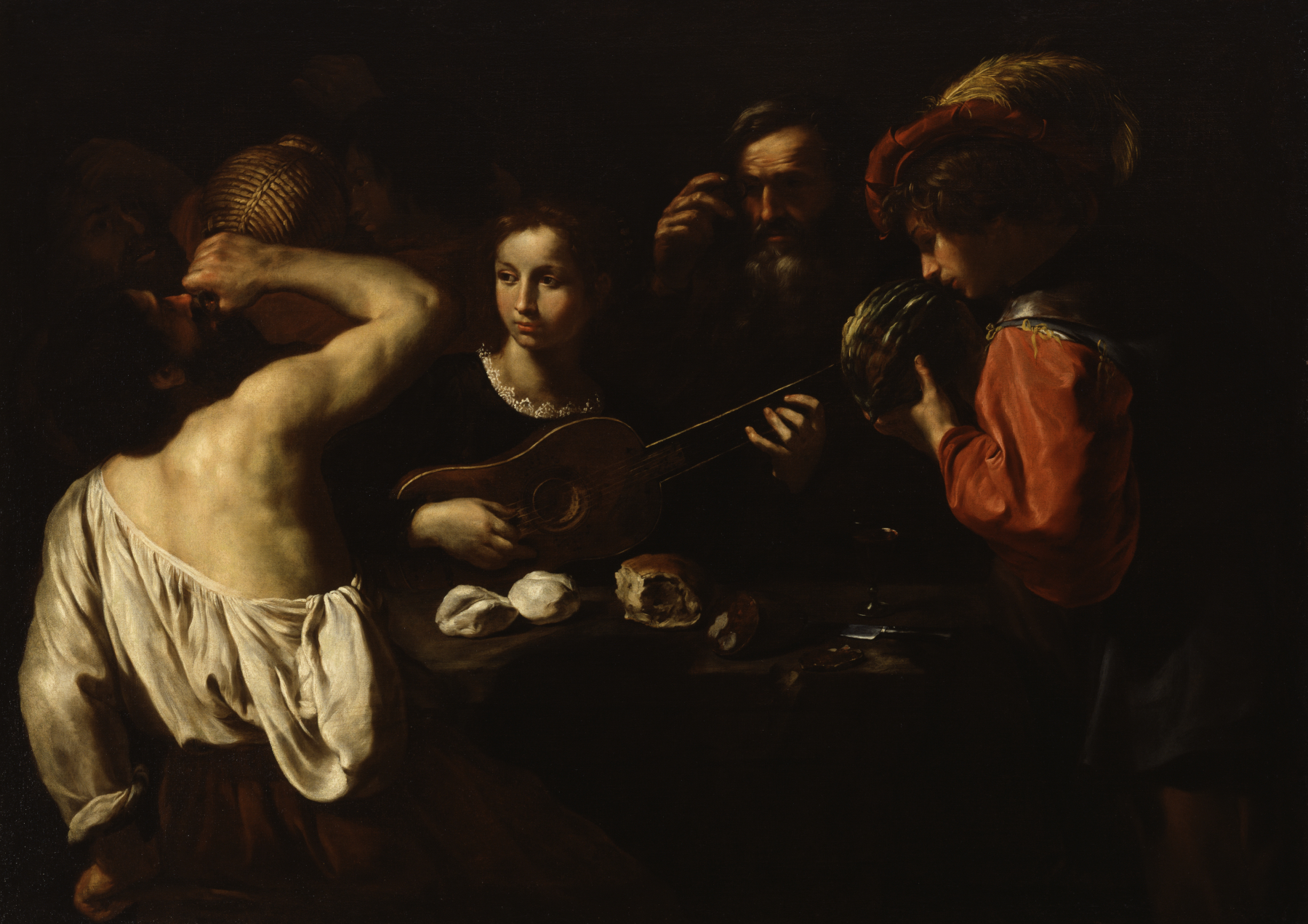
Allegory of the Five Senses by Pietro Paolini, c. 1630, in which each individual represents one of the five senses.

The traditional five senses are enumerated as the "five material faculties" (pañcannaṃ indriyānaṃ avakanti; indriya) in Hindu literature. They appear in allegorical representation as early as in the Katha Upanishad (roughly 6th century BC), as five horses drawing the "chariot" of the body, guided by the mind as "chariot driver".

In Buddhist philosophy, āyatana or "sense-base" includes the mind as a sense organ, in addition to the traditional five. The mind considered by itself is seen as the principal gateway to a different spectrum of phenomena that differ from the physical sense data.

== See also ==
- Aesthesis
- An Immense World
- Apperception
- Attention
- Chemesthesis
- Extrasensory perception
- Entoptic phenomenon
- Increased sensitivity:
  - Hyperacusis
  - Hyperesthesia
  - Supertaster
- Illusions
  - Auditory illusion
  - Optical illusion
  - Touch illusion
- Multisensory integration
- Phantom limb
- Sensation and perception psychology
- Sense of direction
- Sensitivity (human)
- Sensorium
- Sensory processing disorder
- Synesthesia (Ideasthesia)
