= Stimulus (physiology) =

Detectable change in the internal or external surroundings

The light from the lamp (1.) functions as a detectable change in the plant's environment. As a result, the plant exhibits a reaction of phototropism—directional growth (2.) toward the light stimulus.

In physiology, a stimulus is a change within an organism's internal or external environment. This change, when detected by an organism or organ using sensitivity, can lead to a physiological reaction. Sensory receptors can receive stimuli from outside the body, as in touch receptors in skin or light receptors in the eye, as well as from inside the body, as in chemoreceptors and mechanoreceptors. When detected by a sensory receptor, a stimulus can elicit a reflex via stimulus transduction. An internal stimulus is often the first component of a homeostatic control system. External stimuli are capable of producing systemic responses throughout a body, as in the fight-or-flight response. For a stimulus to be detected with high probability, its level of strength must exceed the absolute threshold; if a signal does reach threshold, the information is transmitted to the central nervous system (CNS), where it is integrated and a decision on how to react is made. Although stimuli commonly cause the body to respond, it is the CNS that finally determines whether a signal causes a reaction or not.

The term stimulus represents a borrowing from the Latin word stimulus, meaning "a goad".

== Types ==
=== Internal ===
==== Homeostatic imbalances ====
Homeostatic outbalances are the main driving force for changes of the body. These stimuli are monitored closely by receptors and sensors in different parts of the body. These sensors are mechanoreceptors, chemoreceptors and thermoreceptors that, respectively, respond to pressure or stretching, chemical changes, or temperature changes. Examples of mechanoreceptors include baroreceptors which detect changes in blood pressure, Merkel's discs which can detect sustained touch and pressure, and hair cells which detect sound stimuli. Homeostatic imbalances that can serve as internal stimuli include nutrient and ion levels in the blood, oxygen levels, and water levels. Deviations from the homeostatic ideal may generate a homeostatic emotion, such as pain, thirst or fatigue, that motivates behavior that will restore the body to stasis (such as withdrawal, drinking or resting).

==== Blood pressure ====
Blood pressure, heart rate, and cardiac output are measured by stretch receptors found in the carotid arteries. Nerves embed themselves within these receptors and when they detect stretching, they are stimulated and fire action potentials to the central nervous system. These impulses inhibit the constriction of blood vessels and lower the heart rate. If these nerves do not detect stretching, the body determines perceives low blood pressure as a dangerous stimulus and signals are not sent, preventing the inhibition CNS action; blood vessels constrict and the heart rate increases, causing an increase in blood pressure in the body.

=== External ===
==== Touch and pain ====
Sensory feelings, especially pain, are stimuli that can elicit a large response and cause neurological changes in the body. Pain also causes a behavioral change in the body, which is proportional to the intensity of the pain. The feeling is recorded by sensory receptors on the skin and travels to the central nervous system, where it is integrated and a decision on how to respond is made; if it is decided that a response must be made, a signal is sent back down to a muscle, which behaves appropriately according to the stimulus. The postcentral gyrus is the location of the primary somatosensory area, the main sensory receptive area for the sense of touch.

Pain receptors are known as nociceptors. Two main types of nociceptors exist, A-fiber nociceptors and C-fiber nociceptors. A-fiber receptors are myelinated and conduct currents rapidly. They are mainly used to conduct fast and sharp types of pain. Conversely, C-fiber receptors are unmyelinated and slowly transmit. These receptors conduct slow, burning, diffuse pain.

The absolute threshold for touch is the minimum amount of sensation needed to elicit a response from touch receptors. This amount of sensation has a definable value and is often considered to be the force exerted by dropping the wing of a bee onto a person's cheek from a distance of one centimeter. This value will change based on the body part being touched.

==== Vision ====
Vision provides opportunity for the brain to perceive and respond to changes occurring around the body. Information, or stimuli, in the form of light enters the retina, where it excites a special type of neuron called a photoreceptor cell. A local graded potential begins in the photoreceptor, where it excites the cell enough for the impulse to be passed along through a track of neurons to the central nervous system. As the signal travels from photoreceptors to larger neurons, action potentials must be created for the signal to have enough strength to reach the CNS. If the stimulus does not warrant a strong enough response, it is said to not reach absolute threshold, and the body does not react. However, if the stimulus is strong enough to create an action potential in neurons away from the photoreceptor, the body will integrate the information and react appropriately. Visual information is processed in the occipital lobe of the CNS, specifically in the primary visual cortex.

The absolute threshold for vision is the minimum amount of sensation needed to elicit a response from photoreceptors in the eye. This amount of sensation has a definable value and is often considered to be the amount of light present from someone holding up a single candle 30 miles away, if one's eyes were adjusted to the dark.

==== Smell ====
Smell allows the body to recognize chemical molecules in the air through inhalation. Olfactory organs located on either side of the nasal septum consist of olfactory epithelium and lamina propria. The olfactory epithelium, which contains olfactory receptor cells, covers the inferior surface of the cribiform plate, the superior portion of the perpendicular plate, the superior nasal concha. Only roughly two percent of airborne compounds inhaled are carried to olfactory organs as a small sample of the air being inhaled. Olfactory receptors extend past the epithelial surface providing a base for many cilia that lie in the surrounding mucus. Odorant-binding proteins interact with these cilia stimulating the receptors. Odorants are generally small organic molecules. Greater water and lipid solubility is related directly to stronger smelling odorants. Odorant binding to G protein coupled receptors activates adenylate cyclase, which converts ATP to camp. cAMP, in turn, promotes the opening of sodium channels resulting in a localized potential.

The absolute threshold for smell is the minimum amount of sensation needed to elicit a response from receptors in the nose. This amount of sensation has a definable value and is often considered to be a single drop of perfume in a six-room house. This value will change depending on what substance is being smelled.

==== Taste ====
Taste records flavoring of food and other materials that pass across the tongue and through the mouth. Gustatory cells are located on the surface of the tongue and adjacent portions of the pharynx and larynx. Gustatory cells form on taste buds, specialized epithelial cells, and are generally turned over every ten days. From each cell, protrudes microvilli, sometimes called taste hairs, through also the taste pore and into the oral cavity. Dissolved chemicals interact with these receptor cells; different tastes bind to specific receptors. Salt and sour receptors are chemically gated ion channels, which depolarize the cell. Sweet, bitter, and umami receptors are called gustducins, specialized G protein coupled receptors. Both divisions of receptor cells release neurotransmitters to afferent fibers causing action potential firing.

The absolute threshold for taste is the minimum amount of sensation needed to elicit a response from receptors in the mouth. This amount of sensation has a definable value and is often considered to be a single drop of quinine sulfate in 250 gallons of water.

==== Sound ====
Changes in pressure caused by sound reaching the external ear resonate in the tympanic membrane, which articulates with the auditory ossicles, or the bones of the middle ear. These tiny bones multiply these pressure fluctuations as they pass the disturbance into the cochlea, a spiral-shaped bony structure within the inner ear. Hair cells in the cochlear duct, specifically the organ of Corti, are deflected as waves of fluid and membrane motion travel through the chambers of the cochlea. Bipolar sensory neurons located in the center of the cochlea monitor the information from these receptor cells and pass it on to the brainstem via the cochlear branch of cranial nerve VIII. Sound information is processed in the temporal lobe of the CNS, specifically in the primary auditory cortex.

The absolute threshold for sound is the minimum amount of sensation needed to elicit a response from receptors in the ears. This amount of sensation has a definable value and is often considered to be a watch ticking in an otherwise soundless environment 20 feet away.

==== Equilibrium ====
Semicircular ducts, which are connected directly to the cochlea, can interpret and communicate to the brain information about equilibrium by a similar method as the one used for hearing. Hair cells in these parts of the ear protrude kinocilia and stereocilia into a gelatinous material that lines the ducts of this canal. In parts of these semicircular canals, specifically the maculae, calcium carbonate crystals known as statoconia rest on the surface of this gelatinous material. When tilting the head or when the body undergoes linear acceleration, these crystals move disturbing the cilia of the hair cells and, consequently, affecting the release of neurotransmitters to be taken up by surrounding sensory nerves. In other areas of the semicircular canal, specifically the ampulla, a structure known as the cupula—analogous to the gelatinous material in the maculae—similarly distorts hair cells when the fluid medium that surrounds it causes the cupula itself to move. The ampulla communicates to the brain information about the head's horizontal rotation. Neurons of the adjacent vestibular ganglia monitor the hair cells in these ducts. These sensory fibers form the vestibular branch of the cranial nerve VIII.

== Cellular response ==
In general, cellular response to stimuli is defined as a change in state or activity of a cell in terms of movement, secretion, enzyme production, or gene expression. Receptors on cell surfaces are sensing components that monitor stimuli and respond to changes in the environment by relaying the signal to a control center for further processing and response. Stimuli are always converted into electrical signals via transduction. This electrical signal, or receptor potential, takes a specific pathway through the nervous system to initiate a systematic response. Each type of receptor is specialized to respond preferentially to only one kind of stimulus energy, called the adequate stimulus. Sensory receptors have a well-defined range of stimuli to which they respond, and each is tuned to the particular needs of the organism. Stimuli are relayed throughout the body by mechanotransduction or chemotransduction, depending on the nature of the stimulus.

=== Mechanical ===
In response to a mechanical stimulus, cellular sensors of force are proposed to be extracellular matrix molecules, cytoskeleton, transmembrane proteins, proteins at the membrane-phospholipid interface, elements of the nuclear matrix, chromatin, and the lipid bilayer. Response can be twofold: the extracellular matrix, for example, is a conductor of mechanical forces but its structure and composition is also influenced by the cellular responses to those same applied or endogenously generated forces. Mechanosensitive ion channels are found in many cell types and it has been shown that the permeability of these channels to cations is affected by stretch receptors and mechanical stimuli. This permeability of ion channels is the basis for the conversion of the mechanical stimulus into an electrical signal.

=== Chemical ===
Chemical stimuli, such as odorants, are received by cellular receptors that are often coupled to ion channels responsible for chemotransduction. Such is the case in olfactory cells. Depolarization in these cells result from opening of non-selective cation channels upon binding of the odorant to the specific receptor. G protein-coupled receptors in the plasma membrane of these cells can initiate second messenger pathways that cause cation channels to open.

In response to stimuli, the sensory receptor initiates sensory transduction by creating graded potentials or action potentials in the same cell or in an adjacent one. Sensitivity to stimuli is obtained by chemical amplification through second messenger pathways in which enzymatic cascades produce large numbers of intermediate products, increasing the effect of one receptor molecule.

== Systematic response ==
=== Nervous-system response ===
Though receptors and stimuli are varied, most extrinsic stimuli first generate localized graded potentials in the neurons associated with the specific sensory organ or tissue. In the nervous system, internal and external stimuli can elicit two different categories of responses: an excitatory response, normally in the form of an action potential, and an inhibitory response. When a neuron is stimulated by an excitatory impulse, neuronal dendrites are bound by neurotransmitters which cause the cell to become permeable to a specific type of ion; the type of neurotransmitter determines to which ion the neurotransmitter will become permeable. In excitatory postsynaptic potentials, an excitatory response is generated. This is caused by an excitatory neurotransmitter, normally glutamate, binding to a neuron's dendrites, causing an influx of sodium ions through channels located near the binding site.

This change in membrane permeability in the dendrites is known as a local graded potential and causes the membrane voltage to change from a negative resting potential to a more positive voltage, a process known as depolarisation. The opening of sodium channels allows nearby sodium channels to open, allowing the change in permeability to spread from the dendrites to the cell body. If a graded potential is strong enough, or if several graded potentials occur in a fast enough frequency, the depolarization can spread across the cell body to the axon hillock. From the axon hillock, an action potential can be generated and propagated down the neuron's axon, causing sodium ion channels in the axon to open as the impulse travels. Once the signal begins to travel down the axon, the membrane potential has already passed threshold, which means that it cannot be stopped. This phenomenon is known as an all-or-nothing response. Groups of sodium channels opened by the change in membrane potential strengthen the signal as it travels away from the axon hillock, allowing it to move the length of the axon. As the depolarization reaches the end of the axon, or the axon terminal, the end of the neuron becomes permeable to calcium ions, which enters the cell via calcium ion channels. Calcium causes the release of neurotransmitters stored in synaptic vesicles, which enter the synapse between two neurons known as the presynaptic and postsynaptic neurons; if the signal from the presynaptic neuron is excitatory, it will cause the release of an excitatory neurotransmitter, causing a similar response in the postsynaptic neuron. These neurons may communicate with thousands of other receptors and target cells through extensive, complex dendritic networks. Communication between receptors in this fashion enables discrimination and the more explicit interpretation of external stimuli. Effectively, these localized graded potentials trigger action potentials that communicate, in their frequency, along nerve axons eventually arriving in specific cortexes of the brain. In these also highly specialized parts of the brain, these signals are coordinated with others to possibly trigger a new response.

If a signal from the presynaptic neuron is inhibitory, inhibitory neurotransmitters, normally GABA will be released into the synapse. This neurotransmitter causes an inhibitory postsynaptic potential in the postsynaptic neuron. This response will cause the postsynaptic neuron to become permeable to chloride ions, making the membrane potential of the cell negative; a negative membrane potential makes it more difficult for the cell to fire an action potential and prevents any signal from being passed on through the neuron. Depending on the type of stimulus, a neuron can be either excitatory or inhibitory.

=== Muscular-system response ===
Nerves in the peripheral nervous system spread out to various parts of the body, including muscle fibers. A muscle fiber and the motor neuron to which it is connected. The spot at which the motor neuron attaches to the muscle fiber is known as the neuromuscular junction. When muscles receive information from internal or external stimuli, muscle fibers are stimulated by their respective motor neuron. Impulses are passed from the central nervous system down neurons until they reach the motor neuron, which releases the neurotransmitter acetylcholine (ACh) into the neuromuscular junction. ACh binds to nicotinic acetylcholine receptors on the surface of the muscle cell and opens ion channels, allowing sodium ions to flow into the cell and potassium ions to flow out; this ion movement causes a depolarization, which allows for the release of calcium ions within the cell. Calcium ions bind to proteins within the muscle cell to allow for muscle contraction; the ultimate consequence of a stimulus.

=== Endocrine-system response ===
==== Vasopressin ====
The endocrine system is affected largely by many internal and external stimuli. One internal stimulus that causes hormone release is blood pressure. Hypotension, or low blood pressure, is a large driving force for the release of vasopressin, a hormone which causes the retention of water in the kidneys. This process also increases an individual's thirst. By fluid retention or by consuming fluids, if an individual's blood pressure returns to normal, vasopressin release slows, and less fluid is retained by the kidneys. Hypovolemia, or low fluid levels in the body, can also act as a stimulus to cause this response.

==== Epinephrine ====
Epinephrine, also known as adrenaline, is also used commonly to respond to both internal and external changes. One common cause of the release of this hormone is the fight-or-flight response. When the body encounters an external stimulus that is potentially dangerous, epinephrine is released from the adrenal glands. Epinephrine causes physiological changes in the body, such as constriction of blood vessels, dilation of pupils, increased heart and respiratory rate, and the metabolism of glucose. All of these responses to a single stimulus aid in protecting the individual, whether the decision is made to stay and fight or run away and avoid danger.

=== Digestive-system response ===
==== Cephalic phase ====
The digestive system can respond to external stimuli, such as the sight or smell of food, and cause physiological changes before the food ever enters the body. This reflex is known as the cephalic phase of digestion. The sight and smell of food are strong enough stimuli to cause salivation, gastric and pancreatic enzyme secretion, and endocrine secretion in preparation for the incoming nutrients; by starting the digestive process before food reaches the stomach, the body can more effectively and efficiently metabolise food into necessary nutrients. Once food hits the mouth, taste and information from receptors in the mouth add to the digestive response. Chemoreceptors and mechanorceptors, activated by chewing and swallowing, further increase the enzyme release in the stomach and intestine.

==== Enteric nervous system ====
The digestive system is also able to respond to internal stimuli. The digestive tract, or enteric nervous system, alone contains millions of neurons. These neurons act as sensory receptors that can detect changes, such as food entering the small intestine, in the digestive tract. Depending on what these sensory receptors detect, certain enzymes and digestive juices from the pancreas and liver can be secreted to aid in metabolism and breakdown of food.

== Research methods and techniques ==
=== Clamping techniques ===
Intracellular measurements of electrical potential across the membrane can be obtained by microelectrode recording. Patch clamp techniques allow for the manipulation of the intracellular or extracellular ionic or lipid concentration while still recording potential. In this way, the effect of various conditions on threshold and propagation can be assessed.

=== Noninvasive neuronal scanning ===
Positron emission tomography (PET) and magnetic resonance imaging (MRI) permit the noninvasive visualisation of activated regions of the brain while the test subject is exposed to different stimuli. Activity is monitored in relation to blood flow to a particular region of the brain.

=== Other methods ===
Hindlimb withdrawal time is another method. In a 2012 paper published in the Journal of Reconstructive Microsurgery, Sorin, Barac and colleagues described monitoring the response of test rats to pain stimuli by inducing an acute, external heat stimulus and measuring hindlimb withdrawal times (HLWT).

== See also ==
- Reflex
- Sensory stimulation therapy
- Stimulation
- Stimulus (psychology)
