= Noxious stimulus =

Stimulus that may damage tissue

A noxious stimulus is a stimulus strong enough to threaten the body's integrity (i.e. cause damage to tissue). Noxious stimulation induces peripheral afferents responsible for transducing pain (including A-delta and C- nerve fibers, as well as free nerve endings) throughout the nervous system of an organism.

The ability to perceive noxious stimuli is a prerequisite for nociception, which itself is a prerequisite for nociceptive pain. A noxious stimulus has been seen to drive nocifensive behavioral responses, which are responses to noxious or painful stimuli. These include reflexive, escape behaviors, to avoid harm to an organism's body.

Because of rare genetic conditions that inhibit the ability to perceive physical pain, such as congenital insensitivity to pain and anhydrosis (CIPA), noxious stimulation does not invariably lead to tissue damage.

Noxious stimuli can either be mechanical (e.g. pinching or other tissue deformation), chemical (e.g. exposure to acid or irritant), or thermal (e.g. high or low temperatures).

There are some types of tissue damage that are not detected by any sensory receptors, and thus cannot cause pain. Therefore, not all noxious stimuli are adequate stimuli of nociceptors. The adequate stimuli of nociceptors are termed nociceptive stimuli.
