= Sensory nerve =

Nerve that carries sensory information toward the central nervous system

- Diagram of afferent and efferent innervation

Details

Identifiers
- Latin: nervus sensorius
- TA98: A14.2.00.022
- TA2: 6132
- FMA: 5868

A sensory nerve, or afferent nerve, is a nerve that contains exclusively afferent nerve fibers. Nerves containing also motor fibers are called mixed. Afferent nerve fibers in a sensory nerve carry sensory information toward the central nervous system (CNS) from different sensory receptors of sensory neurons in the peripheral nervous system (PNS).

Contrarily, a motor nerve carries information from the CNS to the PNS.

Afferent nerve fibers link the sensory neurons throughout the body, in pathways to the relevant processing circuits in the central nervous system.

Afferent nerve fibers are often paired with efferent nerve fibers from the motor neurons (that travel from the CNS to the PNS), in mixed nerves. Stimuli cause nerve impulses in the receptors and alter the potentials, which is known as sensory transduction.

== Spinal cord entry ==
Afferent nerve fibers leave the sensory neuron from the dorsal root ganglia of the spinal cord, and motor commands carried by the efferent fibers leave the cord at the ventral roots. The dorsal and some of the ventral fibers join as spinal nerves or mixed nerves.

== Nerve damage ==
Damage to the sensory nerve causes a wide range of symptoms because of the number of functions performed by the nerve. Traumatic injuries and other damages to the sensory nerves may lead to peripheral neuropathy, with problems such as reduced position sense causing poorer coordination and balance, in addition to reduced sensitivity to temperature change and pain, leading to further problems.

The ability to feel pain or changes in temperature can be affected by damage to the fibers in the sensory nerve. This can cause a failure to notice injuries such as a cut or that a wound is becoming infected. There may also be a lack of detection of heart attacks or other serious conditions. The lack of detection of pain and other sensations is a particularly large problem for those with diabetes, which contributes to the rate of lower limb amputations among this population. Overall, the poor sensation and detection may lead to changes in skin, hair, joint, and bone damage over the years for many people.

== See also ==
- Motor nerve
- Afferent nerve fiber
- Efferent nerve fiber
- Sensory neuron
- Motor neuron
