= Adequate stimulus =

The adequate stimulus is a property of a sensory receptor that determines the type of energy to which a sensory receptor responds with the initiation of sensory transduction. Sensory receptor are specialized to respond to certain types of stimuli. The adequate stimulus is the amount and type of energy required to stimulate a specific sensory organ.

Many of the sensory stimuli are categorized by the mechanics by which they are able to function and their purpose. Sensory receptors that are present within the body typically are made to respond to a single stimulus. Sensory receptors are present all throughout the body, and they take a certain amount of a stimulus to trigger these receptors. The use of these sensory receptors allows the brain to interpret the signals to the body which allow a person to respond to the stimulus if the stimulus reaches a minimum threshold to signal the brain. The sensory receptors will activate the sensory transduction system which will in turn send an electrical or chemical stimulus to a cell, and the cell will then respond with electrical signals to the brain which were produced from action potentials. The minuscule signals, which result from the stimuli, enter the cells must be amplified and turned into a sufficient signal that will be sent to the brain. A sensory receptor's adequate stimulus is determined by the signal transduction mechanisms and ion channels incorporated in the sensory receptor's plasma membrane. Adequate stimulus are often used in relation with sensory thresholds and absolute thresholds to describe the smallest amount of a stimulus needed to activate a feeling within the sensory organ.

== Categorizations of receptors ==
They are categorized through the stimuli to which they respond. Adequate stimulus are also often categorized based on their purpose and locations within the body. The following are the categorizations of receptors within the body:

- Visual – These are found in the visual organs of species and are responsive to stimuli such as light and often consist of light sensitive molecules that enable certain species to have the ability to see the world in which they live.
- Olfaction – These types of receptor sense are activated in order to sense the external molecules that enter the nasal organ and attach to the receptors which will interpret the stimuli and send the signal containing information about the stimuli to the brain.
- Auditory – These types of receptors are often found within the organs used to hear and are responsive to vibrations within the surrounding areas, and they often allow their owners to understand information about sound waves traveling through the aid.
- Vestibular – These types of receptors are usually found within organs used to hear, and they aid in the detection of movement that surrounds the creature using it.
- Gustatory – These sensory receptors are present within the mouth and are responsive to the molecular stimuli that enter the mouth. The receptors in the mouth typically fall into two of the following categories: receptors that are responsive to specific chemicals and receptors that are responsive to particles such as hydrogen ions, which are charged.
- Tactile – These types of receptors are normally present within the skin and are able to respond to stimulation such as heat, pressure, and movement

== Classes ==
There are several different types of stimuli to which adequate stimuli respond. The following are examples of stimuli to which receptors may:

- Light – When the adequate stimulus of a sensory receptor is light, the sensory receptors contain pigment molecules whose shape is transformed by light, and the changes in these molecules activate ion channels which initiate sensory transduction.
- Sound – When the adequate stimulus of a sensory receptor is sound, the sensory receptors are hair cells (mechanoreceptors). These hair cells contain stereocilia, which when bent, trigger the opening of ion channels. Thus hair cells transform the pressure waves of the sound into receptor potentials to initiate sensory transduction.

== Sensory receptors ==
Sensory receptors are the ends of nerves within the body that respond to stimuli. There are many different types of sensory receptors that each respond to stimuli that they are uniquely fitted to res Types of sensory receptors include the following:

- Nociceptor – These are stimulus that are responsive to the stimuli that signal potential damage to the body.
- Photoreceptors – These are receptors that are responsive to light that enters the eye and produces the visual stimuli that many animals use to function.
- Mechanoreceptors – These are receptors that are responsive to physical stimulation such as movement, vibration, and stress.
- Thermoreceptors – These are types of receptors that are present within the skin and monitor any changes in the skins temperature

== Classic examples of absolute threshold ==
In 1962, Eugene Galanter, a psychologist, tested stimuli till people were able to feel them approximately 50% of the time, then used the following as examples of absolute threshold:

- Visual – On a clear, dark night a candle can be seen from approximately 30 miles away.
- Olfactory – A person can smell a single drop of perfume after it has diffused into 3 rooms.
- Auditory – In a silent area, a person can hear a watch tick from approximately 20 feet.
- Vestibular – A person is able to tell of a tilt that when on a clock face is seen to be less than half a minute.
- Gustatory – A person can taste a single teaspoon of sugar which is diluted in 2 gallons of water.
- Tactile – A person can feel a fly's wing dropped from 3 feet above them falling onto their cheek.

Through these conditions, Galanter was able to show that human's sensory organs are often more sensitive than originally thought.
