= Sensory neuron =

Nerve cell that converts environmental stimuli into corresponding internal stimuli

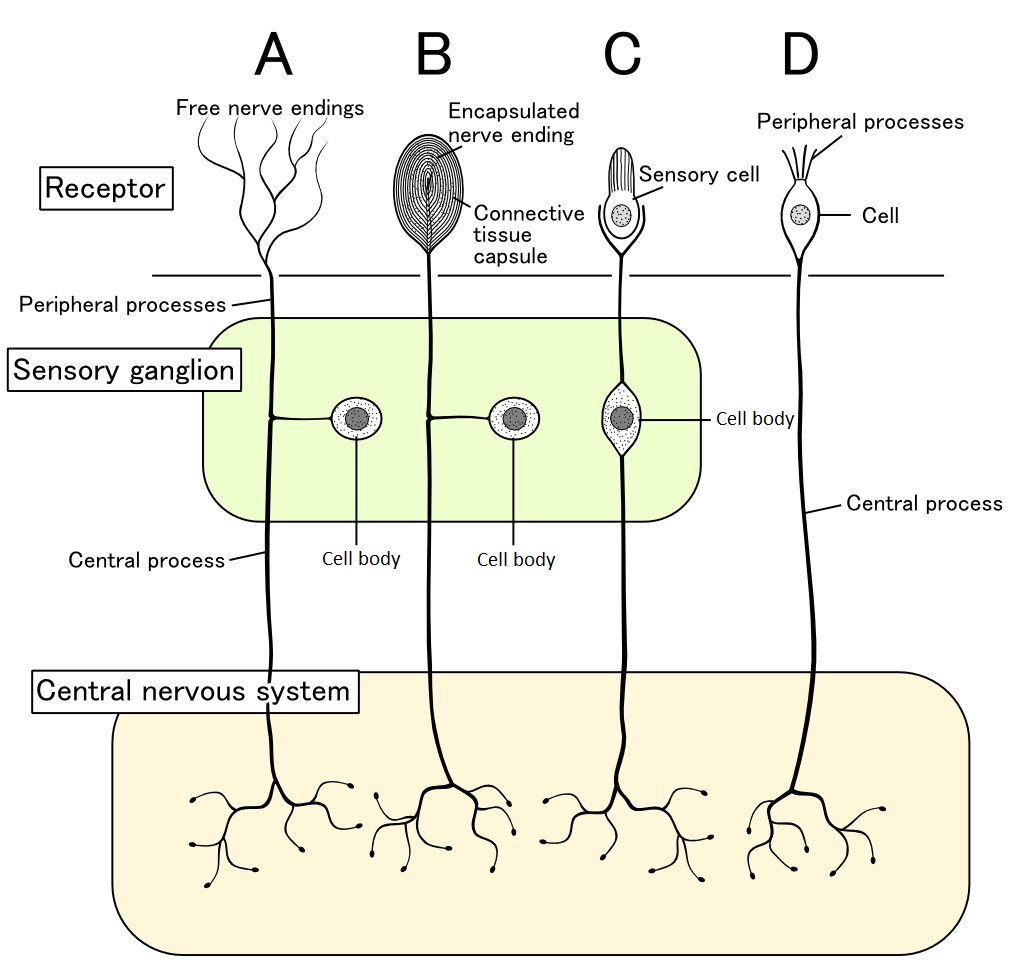
Four types of sensory neuron

Sensory neurons, also known as afferent neurons, are in the nervous system which convert a specific type of stimulus, via their receptors, into action potentials or graded receptor potentials. This process is called sensory transduction. The cell bodies of the sensory neurons are located in the dorsal root ganglia of the spinal cord.

The sensory information travels on the afferent nerve fibers in a sensory nerve, to the brain via the spinal cord. Spinal nerves transmit external sensations via sensory nerves to the brain through the spinal cord. The stimulus can come from exteroreceptors outside the body, or interoreceptors inside the body.

== Types and function ==
Sensory neurons in vertebrates are predominantly pseudounipolar or bipolar, and different types of sensory neurons have different sensory receptors that respond to different kinds of stimuli. There are at least six external and two internal sensory receptors:

=== External receptors ===
External receptors that respond to stimuli from outside the body are called exteroreceptors. Exteroreceptors include chemoreceptors such as olfactory receptors (smell), taste receptors, photoreceptors (vision), thermoreceptors (temperature), nociceptors (pain), hair cells (hearing and balance). There are a number of other different mechanoreceptors for touch and proprioception (stretch, distortion and stress).

These olfactory sensory neurons can be found in the nose.

==== Smell ====
The sensory neurons involved in smell are called olfactory sensory neurons. These neurons contain receptors, called olfactory receptors, that are activated by odor molecules in the air. The molecules in the air are detected by enlarged cilia and microvilli. These sensory neurons produce action potentials. Their axons form the olfactory nerve, and they synapse directly onto neurons in the cerebral cortex (olfactory bulb). They do not use the same route as other sensory systems, bypassing the brain stem and the thalamus. The neurons in the olfactory bulb that receive direct sensory nerve input, have connections to other parts of the olfactory system and many parts of the limbic system.

==== Taste ====
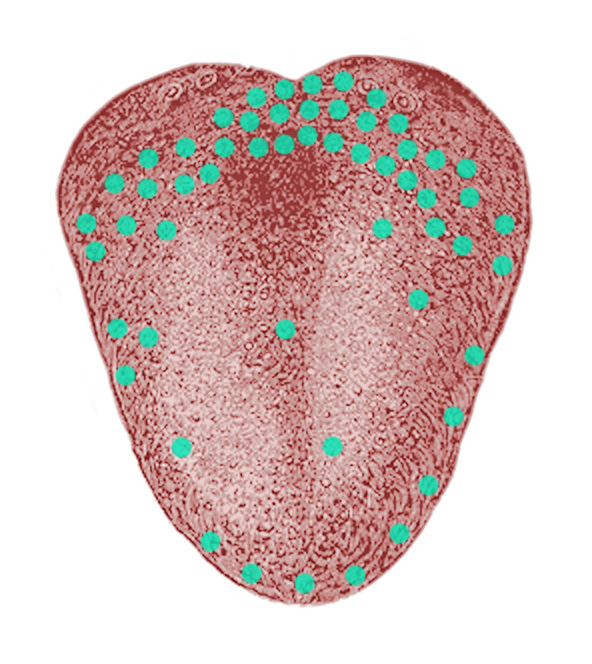
Sensory neurons which allows for taste to be evident within the human body.

Taste sensation is facilitated by specialized sensory neurons located in the taste buds of the tongue and other parts of the mouth and throat. These sensory neurons are responsible for detecting different taste qualities, such as sweet, sour, salty, bitter, and savory. When you eat or drink something, chemicals in the food or liquid interact with receptors on these sensory neurons, triggering signals that are sent to the brain. The brain then processes these signals and interprets them as specific taste sensations, allowing you to perceive and enjoy the flavors of the foods you consume. When taste receptor cells are stimulated by the binding of these chemical compounds (tastants), it can lead to changes in the flow of ions, such as sodium (Na+), calcium (Ca2+), and potassium (K+), across the cell membrane. In response to tastant binding, ion channels on the taste receptor cell membrane can open or close. This can lead to depolarization of the cell membrane, creating an electrical signal.

Similar to olfactory receptors, taste receptors (gustatory receptors) in taste buds interact with chemicals in food to produce an action potential.

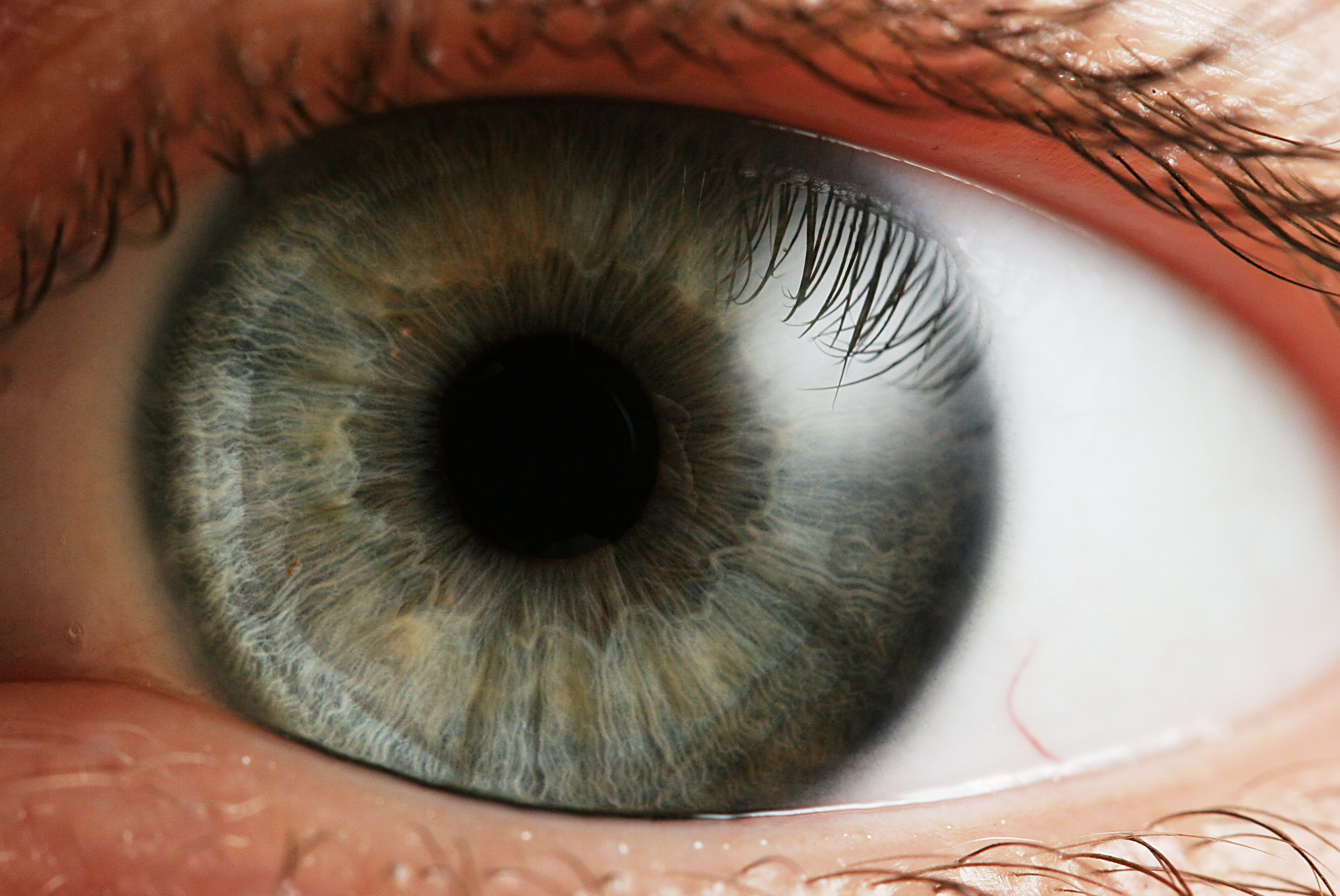
Vision is available due to sensory neurons

==== Vision ====
Photoreceptor cells are capable of phototransduction, a process which converts light (electromagnetic radiation) into electrical signals. These signals are refined and controlled by the interactions with other types of neurons in the retina. The five basic classes of neurons within the retina are photoreceptor cells, bipolar cells, ganglion cells, horizontal cells, and amacrine cells. The basic circuitry of the retina incorporates a three-neuron chain consisting of the photoreceptor (either a rod or cone), bipolar cell, and the ganglion cell. The first action potential occurs in the retinal ganglion cell. This pathway is the most direct way for transmitting visual information to the brain. There are three primary types of photoreceptors: Cones are photoreceptors that respond significantly to color. In humans the three different types of cones correspond with a primary response to short wavelength (blue), medium wavelength (green), and long wavelength (yellow/red). Rods are photoreceptors that are very sensitive to the intensity of light, allowing for vision in dim lighting. The concentrations and ratio of rods to cones is strongly correlated with whether an animal is diurnal or nocturnal. In humans, rods outnumber cones by approximately 20:1, while in nocturnal animals, such as the tawny owl, the ratio is closer to 1000:1. Retinal ganglion cells are involved in the sympathetic response. Of the ~1.3 million ganglion cells present in the retina, 1-2% are believed to be photosensitive.

Issues and decay of sensory neurons associated with vision lead to disorders such as:

1. Macular degeneration – degeneration of the central visual field due to either cellular debris or blood vessels accumulating between the retina and the choroid, thereby disturbing and/or destroying the complex interplay of neurons that are present there.
2. Glaucoma – loss of retinal ganglion cells which causes some loss of vision to blindness.
3. Diabetic retinopathy – poor blood sugar control due to diabetes damages the tiny blood vessels in the retina.

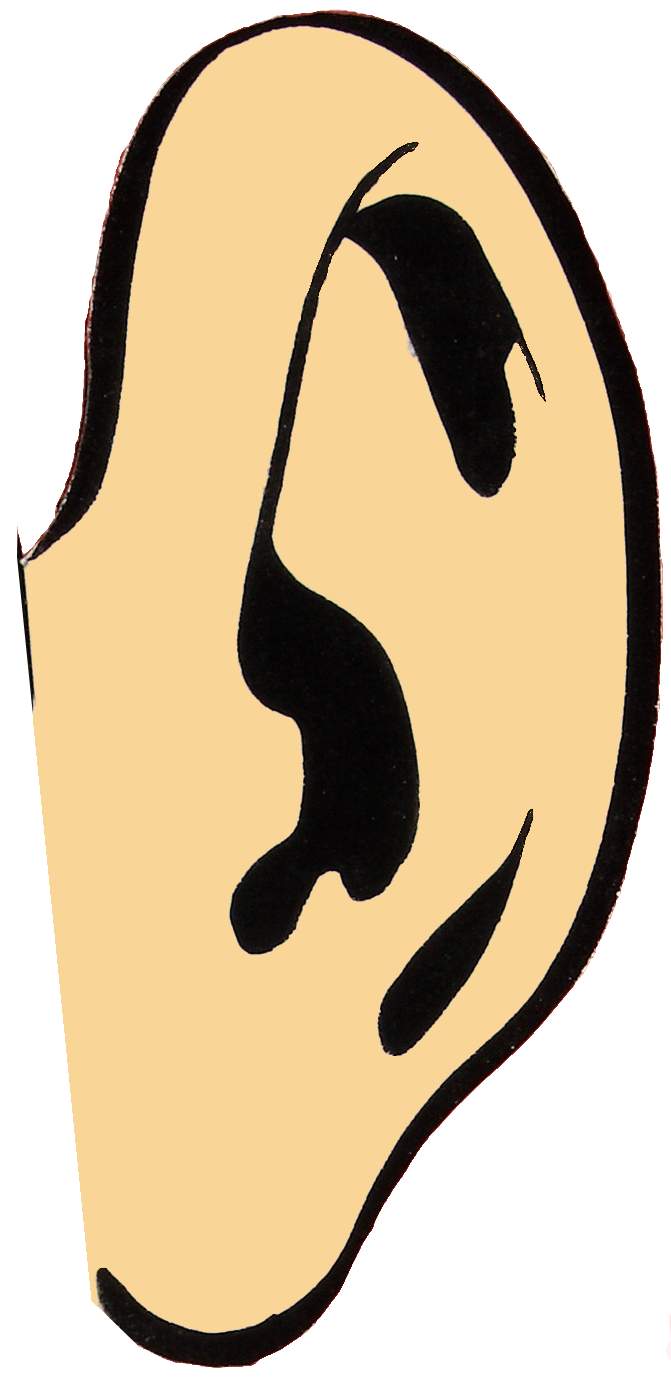
Auditory system sends signals to the brain.

==== Auditory ====
The auditory system is responsible for converting pressure waves generated by vibrating air molecules or sound into signals that can be interpreted by the brain.

This mechanoelectrical transduction is mediated with hair cells within the ear. Depending on the movement, the hair cell can either hyperpolarize or depolarize. When the movement is towards the tallest stereocilia, the Na^{+} cation channels open allowing Na^{+} to flow into cell and the resulting depolarization causes the Ca^{++} channels to open, thus releasing its neurotransmitter into the afferent auditory nerve. There are two types of hair cells: inner and outer. The inner hair cells are the sensory receptors.

Problems with sensory neurons associated with the auditory system leads to disorders such as:

1. Auditory processing disorder – Auditory information in the brain is processed in an abnormal way. Patients with auditory processing disorder can usually gain the information normally, but their brain cannot process it properly, leading to hearing disability.
2. Auditory verbal agnosia – Comprehension of speech is lost but hearing, speaking, reading, and writing ability is retained. This is caused by damage to the posterior superior temporal lobes, again not allowing the brain to process auditory input correctly.

==== Temperature ====
Thermoreceptors are sensory receptors, which respond to varying temperatures. While the mechanisms through which these receptors operate is unclear, recent discoveries have shown that mammals have at least two distinct types of thermoreceptors. The bulboid corpuscle, is a cutaneous receptor a cold-sensitive receptor, that detects cold temperatures. While the other type is a warmth-sensitive receptor.

==== Mechanoreceptors ====
Mechanoreceptors are sensory receptors which respond to mechanical forces, such as pressure or distortion.

Specialized sensory receptor cells called mechanoreceptors often encapsulate afferent fibers to help tune the afferent fibers to the different types of somatic stimulation. Mechanoreceptors also help lower thresholds for action potential generation in afferent fibers and thus make them more likely to fire in the presence of sensory stimulation.

Some types of mechanoreceptors fire action potentials when their membranes are physically stretched.

Proprioceptors are another type of mechanoreceptors which literally means "receptors for self". These receptors provide spatial information about limbs and other body parts.

Nociceptors are responsible for processing pain and temperature changes. The burning pain and irritation experienced after eating a chili pepper (due to its main ingredient, capsaicin), the cold sensation experienced after ingesting a chemical such as menthol or icillin, as well as the common sensation of pain are all a result of neurons with these receptors.

Problems with mechanoreceptors lead to disorders such as:

1. Neuropathic pain - a severe pain condition resulting from a damaged sensory nerve
2. Hyperalgesia - an increased sensitivity to pain caused by sensory ion channel, TRPM8, which is typically responds to temperatures between 23 and 26 degrees, and provides the cooling sensation associated with menthol and icillin
3. Phantom limb syndrome - a sensory system disorder where pain or movement is experienced in a limb that does not exist

=== Internal receptors ===
Internal receptors that respond to changes inside the body are known as interoceptors.

==== Blood ====
The aortic bodies and carotid bodies contain clusters of glomus cells – peripheral chemoreceptors that detect changes in chemical properties in the blood such as oxygen concentration. These receptors are polymodal responding to a number of different stimuli.

==== Nociceptors ====
Nociceptors respond to potentially damaging stimuli by sending signals to the spinal cord and brain. This process, called nociception, usually causes the perception of pain. They are found in internal organs as well as on the surface of the body to "detect and protect". Nociceptors detect different kinds of noxious stimuli indicating potential for damage, then initiate neural responses to withdraw from the stimulus.

1. Thermal nociceptors are activated by noxious heat or cold at various temperatures.
2. Mechanical nociceptors respond to excess pressure or mechanical deformation, such as a pinch.
3. Chemical nociceptors respond to a wide variety of chemicals, some of which signal a response. They are involved in the detection of some spices in food, such as the pungent ingredients in Brassica and Allium plants, which target the sensory neural receptor to produce acute pain and subsequent pain hypersensitivity.

== Connection with the central nervous system ==
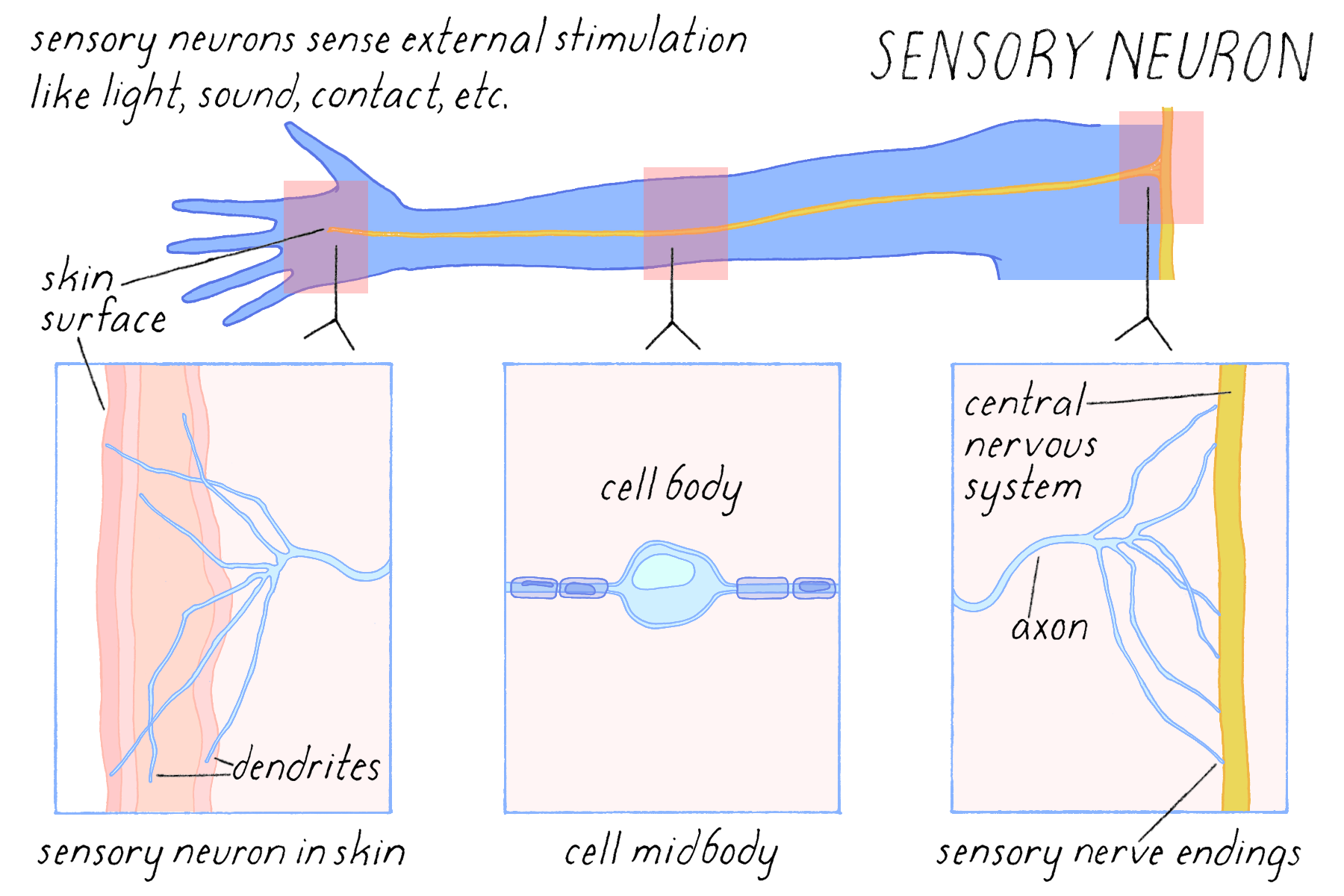
Sensory neurons are specialized cell that senses stimuli from the environment (light, touch, sound, etc.) and relays that information to the central nervous system.

Information coming from the sensory neurons in the head enters the central nervous system (CNS) through cranial nerves. Information from the sensory neurons below the head enters the spinal cord and passes towards the brain through the 31 spinal nerves. The sensory information traveling through the spinal cord follows well-defined pathways. The nervous system codes the differences among the sensations in terms of which cells are active.

== Classification ==
=== Adequate stimulus ===
A sensory receptor's adequate stimulus is the stimulus modality for which it possesses the adequate sensory transduction apparatus. Adequate stimulus can be used to classify sensory receptors:

1. Baroreceptors respond to pressure in blood vessels
2. Chemoreceptors respond to chemical stimuli
3. Electromagnetic radiation receptors respond to electromagnetic radiation
  1. Infrared receptors respond to infrared radiation
  2. Photoreceptors respond to visible light
  3. Ultraviolet receptors respond to ultraviolet radiation
4. Electroreceptors respond to electric fields
  1. Ampullae of Lorenzini respond to electric fields, salinity, and to temperature, but function primarily as electroreceptors
5. Hydroreceptors respond to changes in humidity
6. Magnetoreceptors respond to magnetic fields
7. Mechanoreceptors respond to mechanical stress or mechanical strain
8. Nociceptors respond to damage, or threat of damage, to body tissues, leading (often but not always) to pain perception
9. Osmoreceptors respond to the osmolarity of fluids (such as in the hypothalamus)
10. Proprioceptors provide the sense of position
11. Thermoreceptors respond to temperature, either heat, cold or both

=== Location ===
Sensory receptors can be classified by location:

1. Cutaneous receptors are sensory receptors found in the dermis or epidermis.
2. Muscle spindles contain mechanoreceptors that detect stretch in muscles.

=== Morphology ===
Somatic sensory receptors near the surface of the skin can usually be divided into two groups based on morphology:

1. Free nerve endings characterize the nociceptors and thermoreceptors and are called thus because the terminal branches of the neuron are unmyelinated and spread throughout the dermis and epidermis.
2. Encapsulated receptors consist of the remaining types of cutaneous receptors. Encapsulation exists for specialized functioning.

=== Rate of adaptation ===
1. A tonic receptor is a sensory receptor that adapts slowly to a stimulus and continues to produce action potentials over the duration of the stimulus. In this way it conveys information about the duration of the stimulus. Some tonic receptors are permanently active and indicate a background level. Examples of such tonic receptors are pain receptors, joint capsule, and muscle spindle.
2. A phasic receptor is a sensory receptor that adapts rapidly to a stimulus. The response of the cell diminishes very quickly and then stops. It does not provide information on the duration of the stimulus; instead some of them convey information on rapid changes in stimulus intensity and rate. An example of a phasic receptor is the Pacinian corpuscle.

== Drugs ==
There are many drugs currently on the market that are used to manipulate or treat sensory system disorders. For instance, gabapentin is a drug that is used to treat neuropathic pain by interacting with one of the voltage-dependent calcium channels present on non-receptive neurons. Some drugs may be used to combat other health problems but can have unintended side effects on the sensory system. Dysfunction in the hair cell mechanotransduction complex, along with the potential loss of specialized ribbon synapses, can lead to hair cell death, often caused by ototoxic drugs like aminoglycoside antibiotics poisoning the cochlea. Through the use of these toxins, the K+ pumping hair cells cease their function. Thus, the energy generated by the endocochlear potential which drives the auditory signal transduction process is lost, leading to hearing loss.

== Neuroplasticity research ==
Ever since scientists observed cortical remapping in the brain of Taub's Silver Spring monkeys, there has been a large amount of research into sensory system plasticity. Huge strides have been made in treating disorders of the sensory system. Techniques such as constraint-induced movement therapy developed by Taub have helped patients with paralyzed limbs regain use of their limbs by forcing the sensory system to grow new neural pathways. Phantom limb syndrome is a sensory system disorder in which amputees perceive that their amputated limb still exists, and they may experience pain in it. The mirror box, developed by V.S. Ramachandran, has enabled patients with phantom limb syndrome to relieve the perception of paralyzed or painful phantom limbs. It is a simple device which uses a mirror in a box to create an illusion in which the sensory system perceives that it is seeing two hands instead of one, therefore allowing the sensory system to control the "phantom limb". By doing this, the sensory system can gradually get acclimated to the amputated limb, and thus alleviate this syndrome.

== Other animals ==
Hydrodynamic reception is a form of mechanoreception used in a range of animal species.

== Additional images ==
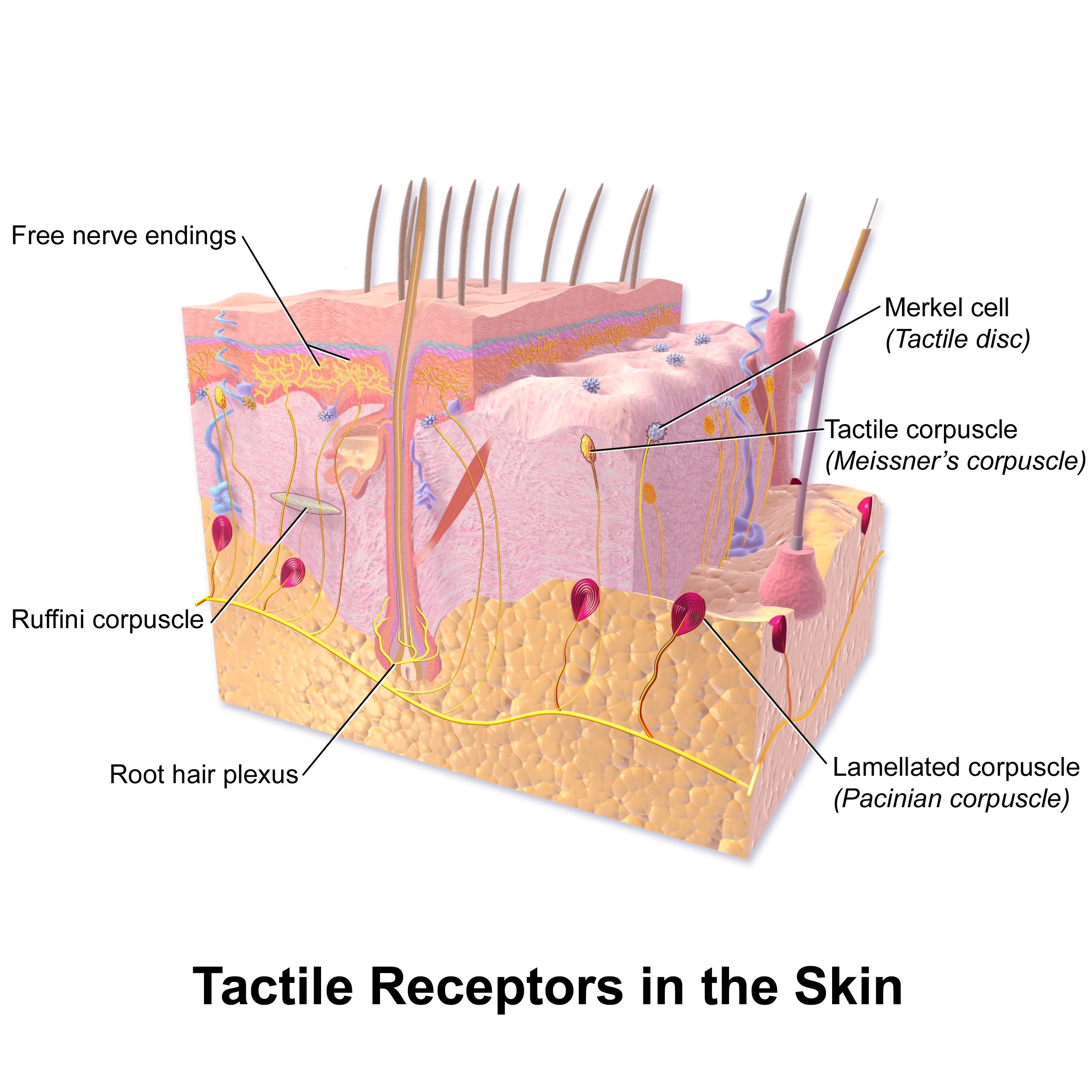
Illustration of tactile receptors in the skin

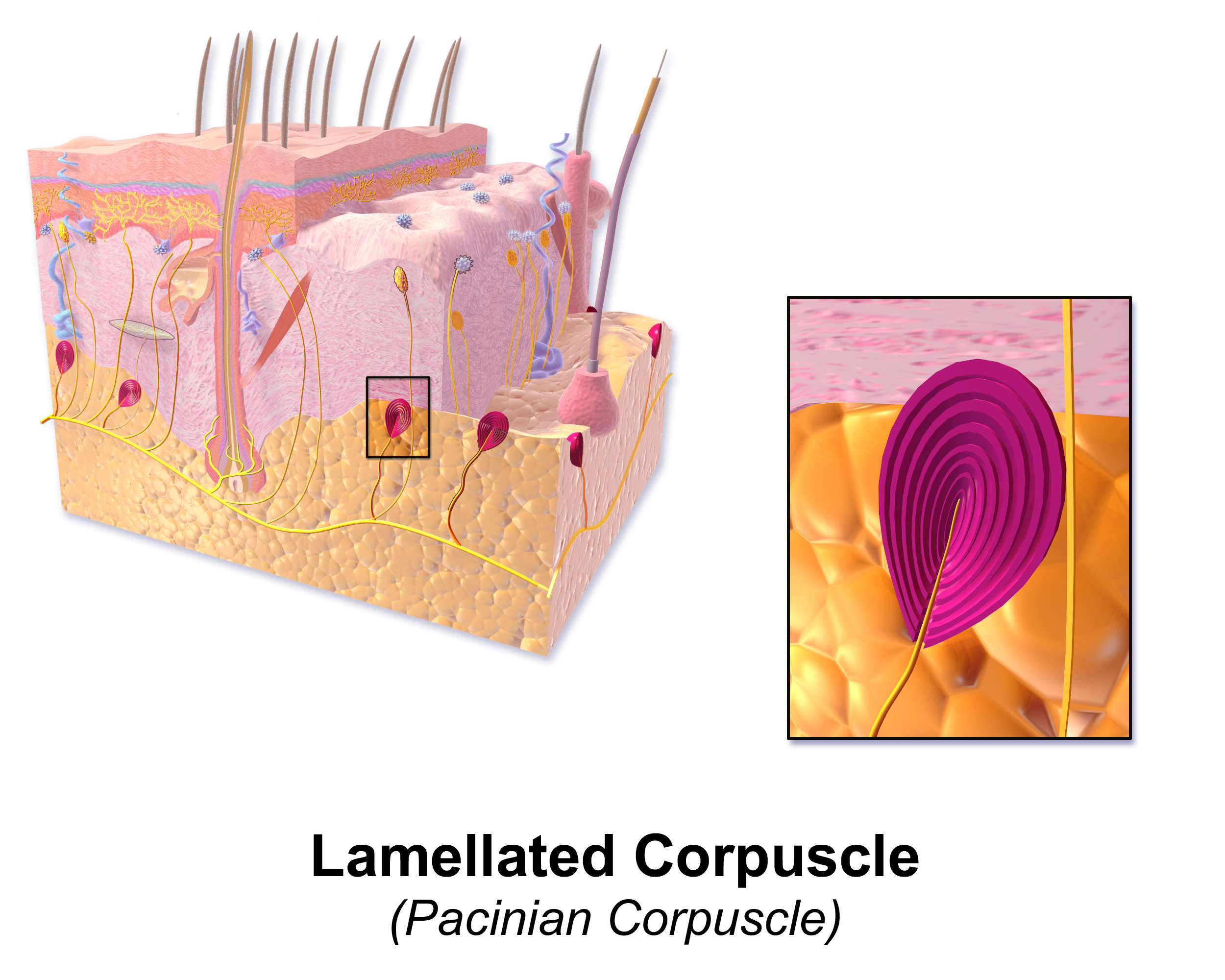
Illustration of lamellated corpuscle

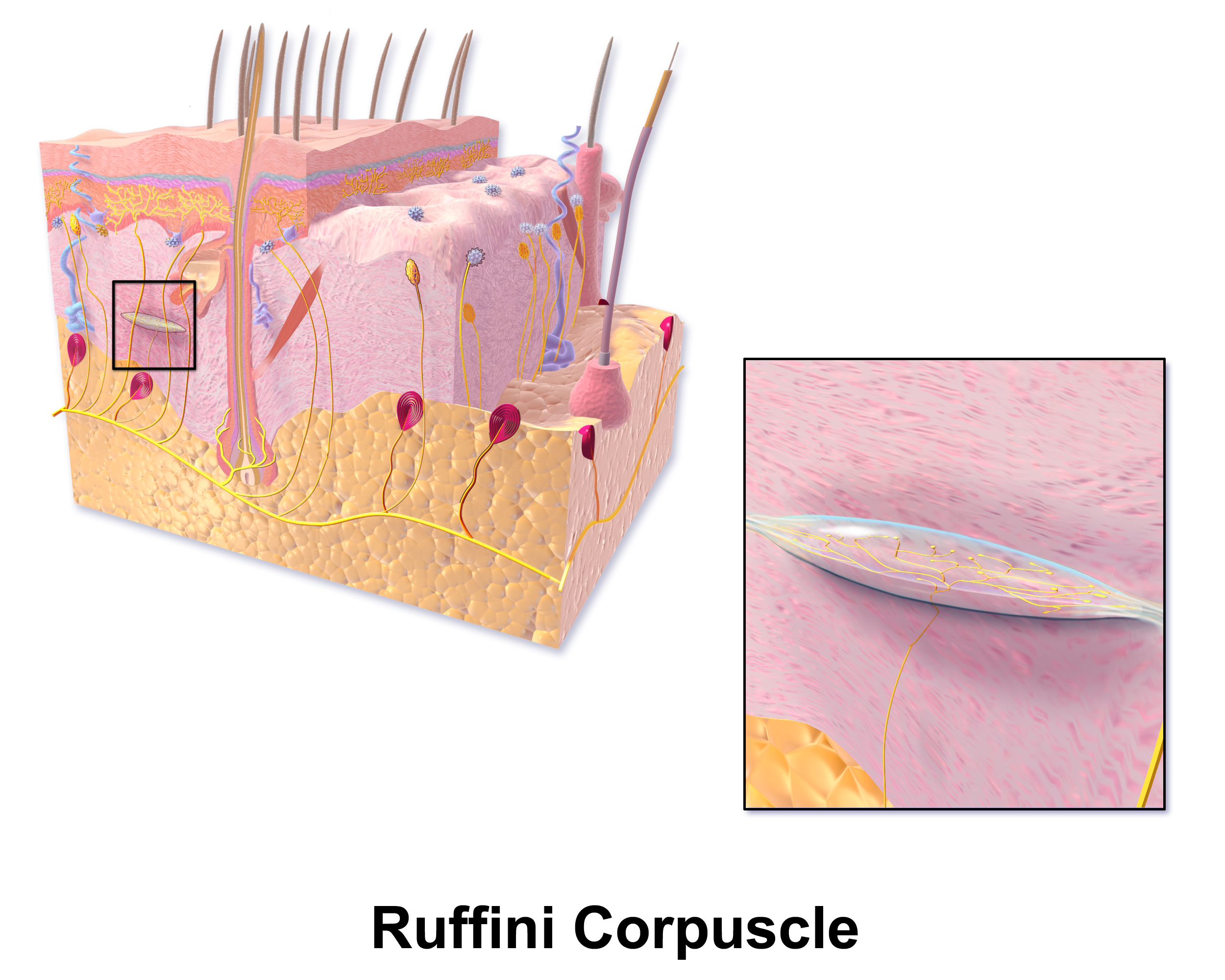
Illustration of Ruffini corpuscle

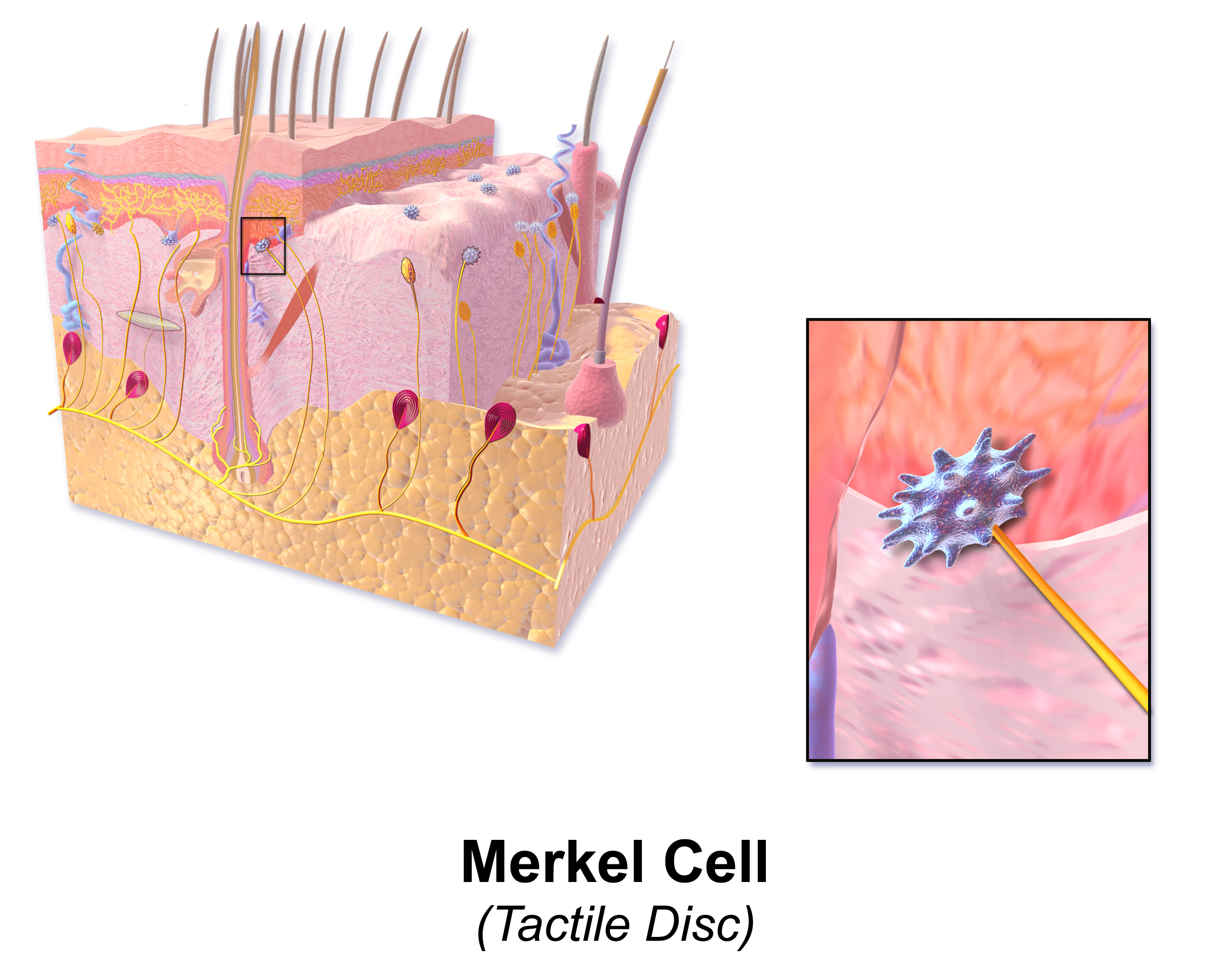
Illustration of skin Merkel cell

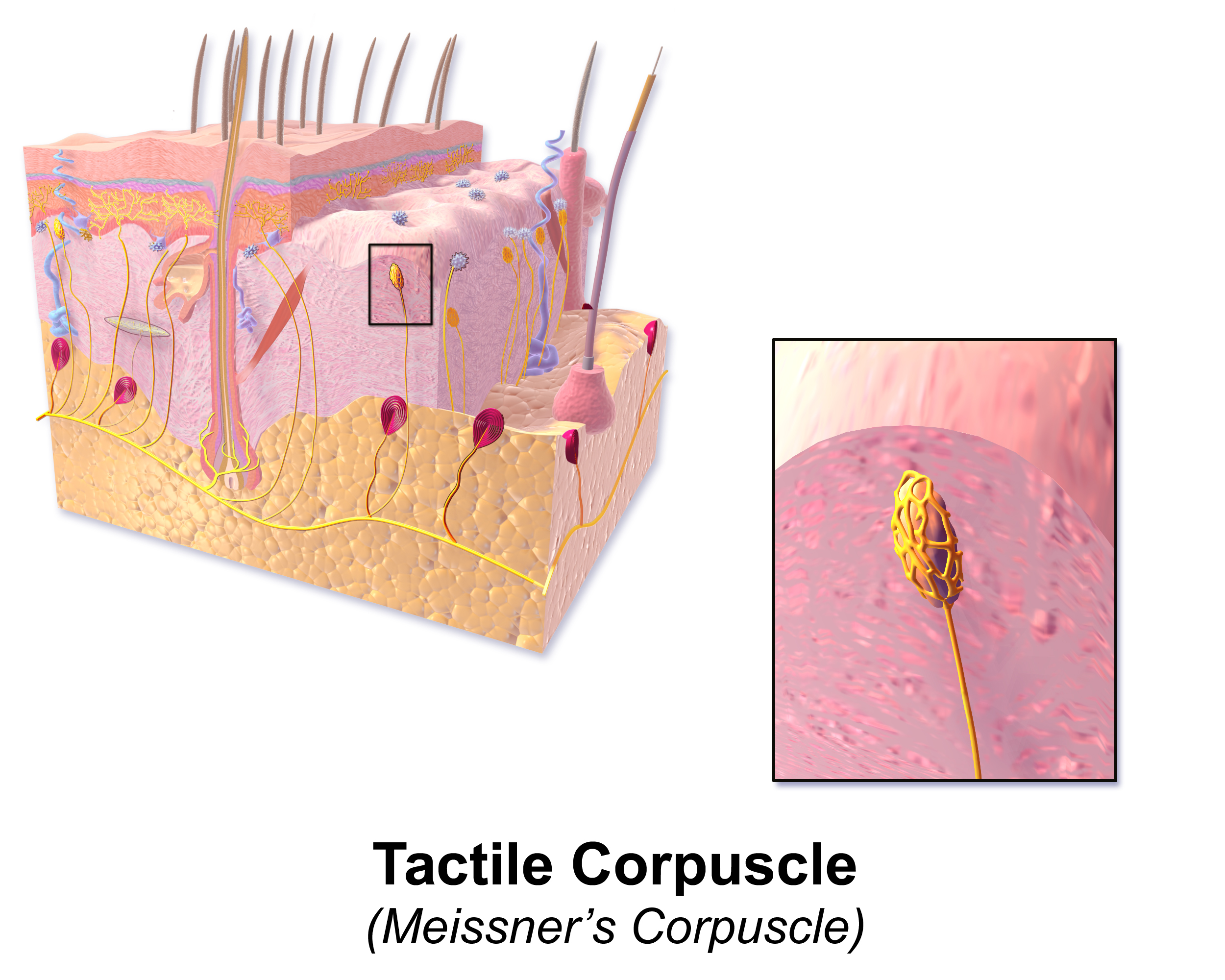
Illustration of tactile corpuscle

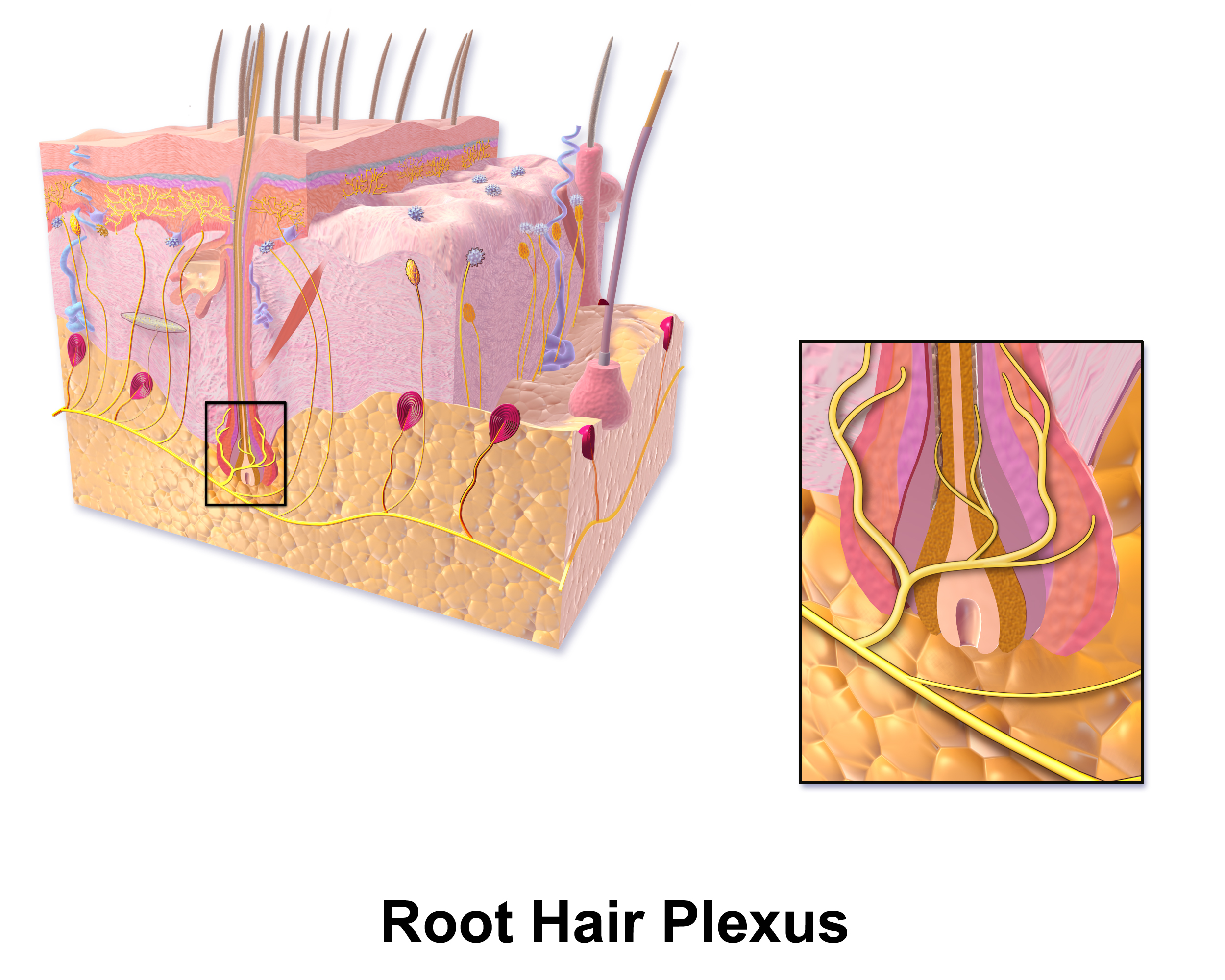
Illustration of root hair plexus

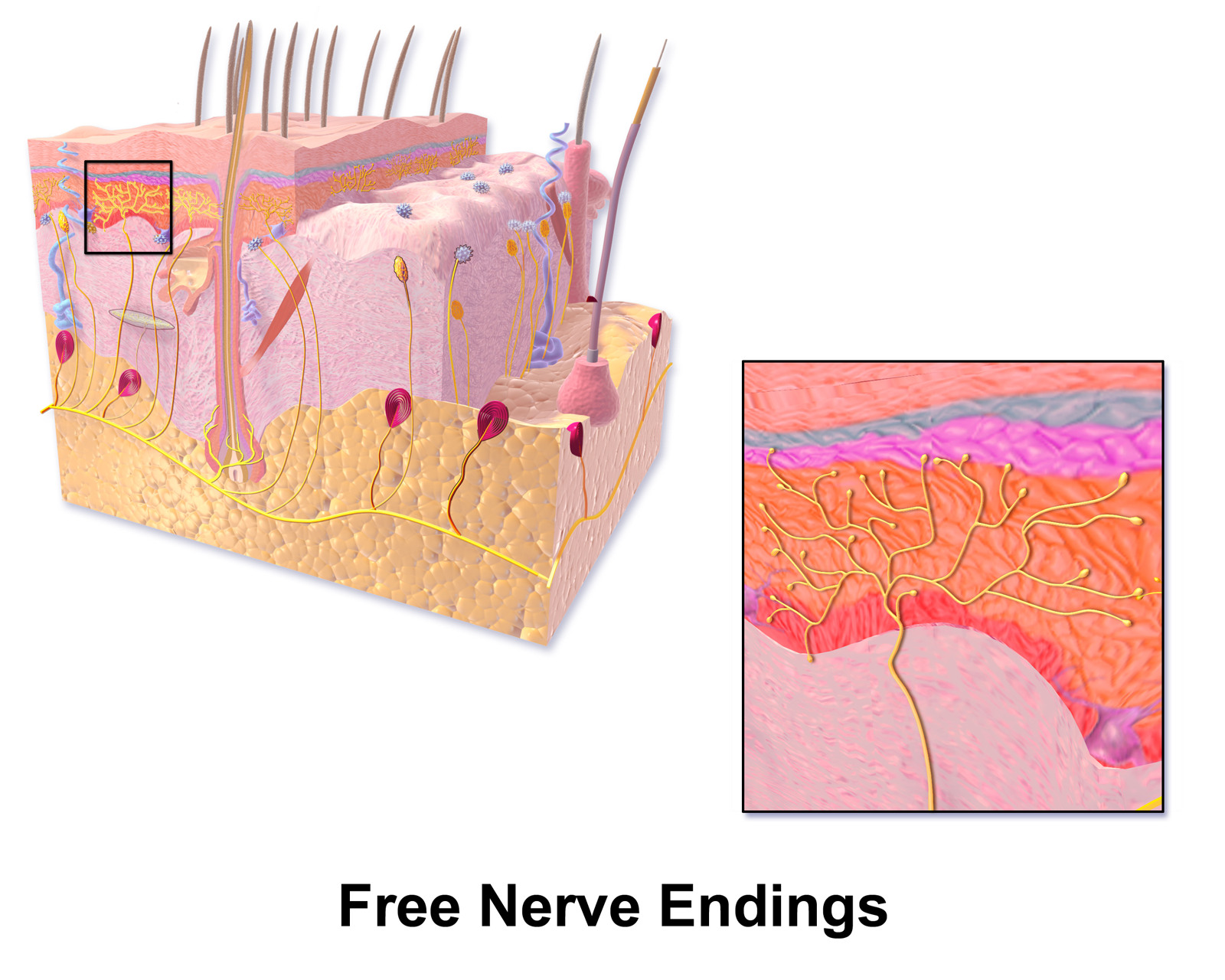
Illustration of free nerve endings

== See also ==
- Pseudounipolar neuron
- Neural coding
- Posterior column
- Receptive field
- Sensory system
- List of distinct cell types in the adult human body
- Sensory nerve
- Motor nerve
- Afferent nerve fiber
- Efferent nerve fiber
- Motor neuron
