= Transduction (physiology) =

Conversion of sensory stimuli

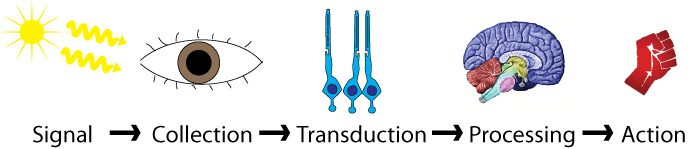
Principal steps of sensory processing.

In physiology, transduction is the translation of arriving stimulus into an action potential by a sensory receptor. It begins when stimulus changes the membrane potential of a sensory receptor.

A sensory receptor converts the energy in a stimulus into an electrical signal. Receptors are broadly split into two main categories: exteroceptors, which receive external sensory stimuli, and interoceptors, which receive internal sensory stimuli.

== Sensory transduction ==
=== The visual system ===
In the visual system, sensory cells called rod and cone cells in the retina convert the physical energy of light signals into electrical impulses that travel to the brain. The light causes a conformational change in a protein called rhodopsin. This conformational change sets in motion a series of molecular events that result in a reduction of the electrochemical gradient of the photoreceptor. The decrease in the electrochemical gradient causes a reduction in the electrical signals going to the brain. Thus, in this example, more light hitting the photoreceptor results in the transduction of a signal into fewer electrical impulses, effectively communicating that stimulus to the brain. A change in neurotransmitter release is mediated through a second messenger system. The change in neurotransmitter release is by rods. Because of the change, a change in light intensity causes the response of the rods to be much slower than expected (for a process associated with the nervous system).

=== The auditory system ===
In the auditory system, sound vibrations (mechanical energy) are transduced into electrical energy by hair cells in the inner ear. Sound vibrations from an object cause vibrations in air molecules, which in turn, vibrate the ear drum. The movement of the eardrum causes the bones of the middle ear (the ossicles) to vibrate. These vibrations then pass into the cochlea, the organ of hearing. Within the cochlea, the hair cells on the sensory epithelium of the organ of Corti bend and cause movement of the basilar membrane. The membrane undulates in different sized waves according to the frequency of the sound. Hair cells are then able to convert this movement (mechanical energy) into electrical signals (graded receptor potentials) which travel along auditory nerves to hearing centres in the brain.

=== The olfactory system ===
In the olfactory system, odorant molecules in the mucus bind to G-protein receptors on olfactory cells. The G-protein activates a downstream signalling cascade that causes increased level of cyclic-AMP (cAMP), which trigger neurotransmitter release.

=== The gustatory system ===
In the gustatory system, perception of five primary taste qualities (sweet, salty, sour, bitter and umami [savoriness] ) depends on taste transduction pathways, through taste receptor cells, G proteins, ion channels, and effector enzymes.

=== The somatosensory system ===
In the somatosensory system the sensory transduction mainly involves the conversion of the mechanical signal such as pressure, skin compression, stretch, vibration to electro-ionic impulses through the process of mechanotransduction. It also includes the sensory transduction related to thermoception and nociception.
