= Role of skin in locomotion =

Use of the integumentary system in animal movement

Role of skin in locomotion describes how the integumentary system is involved in locomotion. Typically the integumentary system can be thought of as skin, however the integumentary system also includes the segmented exoskeleton in arthropods and feathers of birds. The primary role of the integumentary system is to provide protection for the body. However, the structure of the skin has evolved to aid animals in their different modes of locomotion. Soft bodied animals such as starfish rely on the arrangement of the fibers in their tube feet for movement. Eels, snakes, and fish use their skin like an external tendon to generate the propulsive forces need for undulatory locomotion. Vertebrates that fly, glide, and parachute also have a characteristic fiber arrangements of their flight membranes that allows for the skin to maintain its structural integrity during the stress and strain experienced during flight.

== Soft bodied locomotion in invertebrates ==
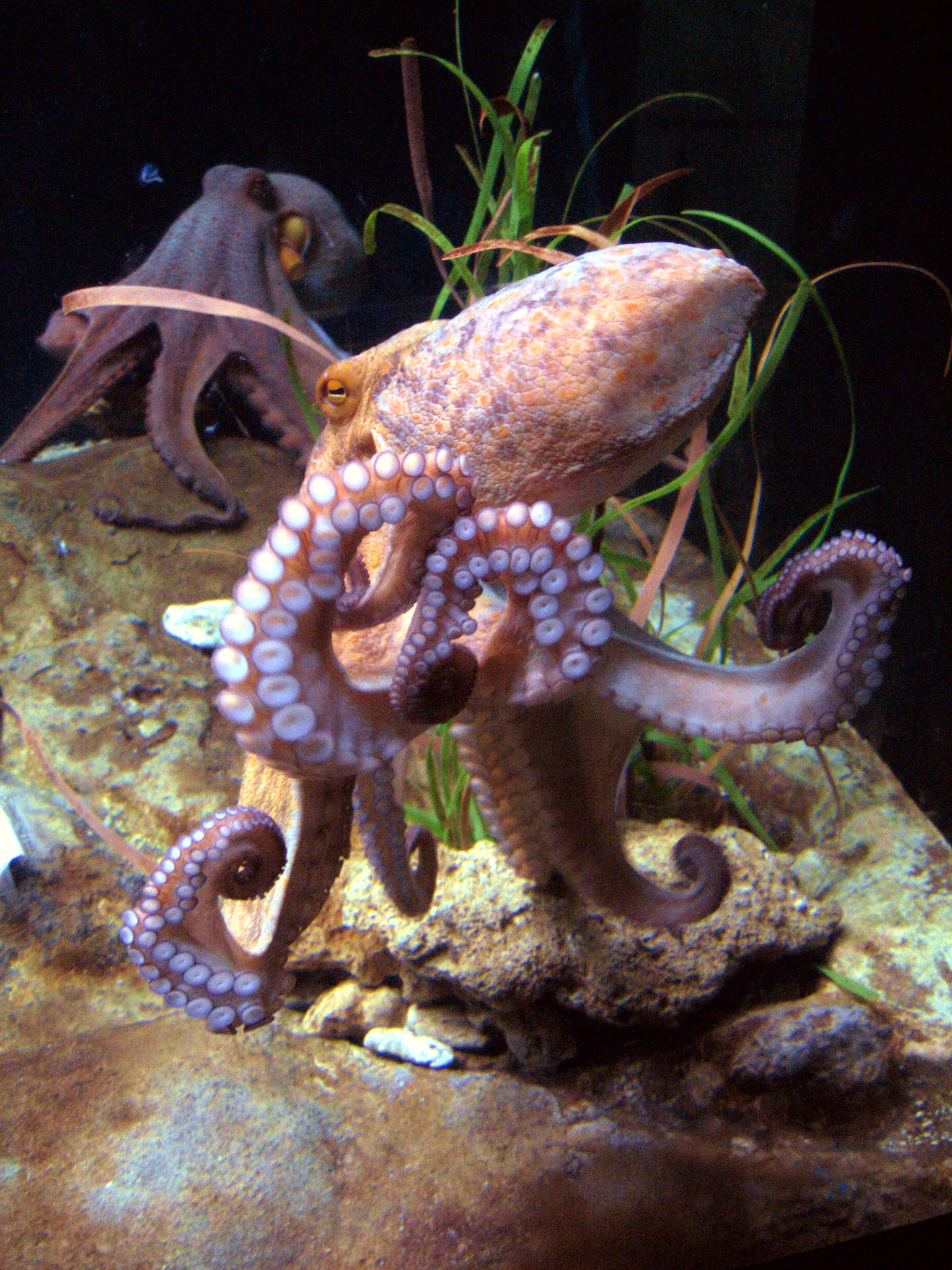
The arms of octopus are muscular hydrostats

The term "Soft Bodied" refers to animals which lack typical systems of skeletal support - included in these are most insect larvae and true worms. Animals that are soft bodied are constrained by the geometry and form of their bodies. However it is the geometry and form of their bodies that generate the forces they need to move. The structure of soft bodied skin can be characterized by a patterned fiber arrangement, which provides the shape and structure for a soft bodied animals. Internal to the patterned fiber layer is typically a liquid filled cavity, which is used to generate hydrostatic pressures for movement. Some animals that exhibit soft bodied locomotion include starfish, octopus, and flatworms.

=== Hydrostatic skeleton ===
A hydrostatic skeleton uses hydrostatic pressure generated from muscle contraction against a liquid filled cavity. The liquid filled cavity is commonly referred to as the hydrostatic body. The liquid within the hydrostatic body acts as an incompressible fluid and the body wall of the hydrostatic body provides a passive elastic antagonist to muscle contraction, which in turn generates a force, which in turn creates movement. This structure plays a role in invertebrate support and locomotor systems and is used for the tube feet in starfish and body of worms. A specialized version of the hydrostatic skeleton is a called a muscular hydrostat, which consists of a tightly packed array of three-dimensional muscle fibers surrounding a hydrostatic body. Examples of muscular hydrostats include the arms of octopus and elephant trunks.

=== Fiber arrangement ===
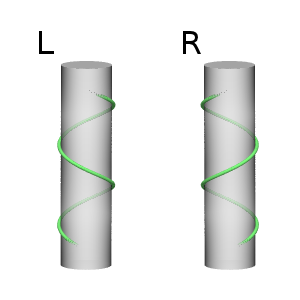
left- and right-handed helices

The arrangement of the connective tissue fibers and muscle fibers create the skeletal support of a soft bodied animal. The arrangement of the fibers around a hydrostatic body limits the range of movement of the hydrostatic body (the "body" of a soft bodied animal) and defines the way the hydrostatic body moves.

==== Muscle fibers ====
Typically muscle fibers surround the hydrostatic body. There are two main types of muscle fibers orientations that are responsible for the movement: the circular orientations and longitudinal orientations. Circular muscles decrease the diameter of a hydrostatic body, resulting in an increase in the length of the body, whereas longitudinal muscles shortens the length of a hydrostatic body, resulting in an increase in the diameter of the body. There are four categories of movements of a hydrostatic skeleton: elongation, shortening, bending and torsion. Elongation, which involves an increase in the length of a hydrostatic body requires either circular muscles, a transverse muscle arrangement, or radial muscle arrangement. For a transverse muscle arrangement, parallel sheets of muscle fibers that extend along the length of a hydrostatic body. For a radial muscle arrangement, radial muscles radiate from a central axis along the axis perpendicular to the long axis. Shortening involves the contraction of the longitudinal muscle. Both shortening and bending involve the contraction of longitudinal muscle, but for bending motion some of the antagonistic muscles work synergistically with longitudinal muscles. The amplitude of movements are based upon the antagonistic muscles forces and the amount of leverage the antagonistic muscle provides for movement. For the torsion motion, muscles are arranged in helical layers around a hydrostatic body. The fiber angle (the angle the fiber makes with the long axis of the body) plays a critical role in torsion, if the angle is greater than 54°44', during muscle contraction, torsion and elongation will occur. If the fiber angle is less than 54°44', torsion and shortening will occur.

==== Connective tissue fibers ====
The arrangement of connective tissue fibers determines the range of motion of a body, and serves as an antagonist against muscle contraction. The most commonly observed connective tissue arrangement for soft bodied animals consists of layers of alternating right and left-handed helices of connective tissue fibers which surround the hydraulic body. This cross helical arrangement is seen in the tube feet starfish, different types of worms and suckers in octopus. This cross helical arrangement allows for the connective tissue layers to evenly distribute force throughout the hydrostatic body. Another commonly observed connective tissue fiber range is when the connective tissue fibers are embedded within a muscle layer. This arrangement of connective tissue fibers creates a stiffer body wall and more muscle antagonism, which allows for more elastic force to be generated and released during movement. This fiber arrangement is seen in the mantle of squid and the fins in sharks.

== Specialized function in vertebrates ==
=== Swimming and undulatory locomotion ===
The skin of these animal that use undulatory motion to locomote have several distinct characteristics. The skin of these animals consists of cross-helical arrangement of collagen and elastin fibers embedded in the dermal layer of skin, a two-dimensional stiffness. which permits bending at small curvatures and resists bending at high curvatures and skin is attached directly to the underlying muscles. Fish, shark, and snakes are all examples of animals that locomote using undulatory locomotion.

==== Eel ====
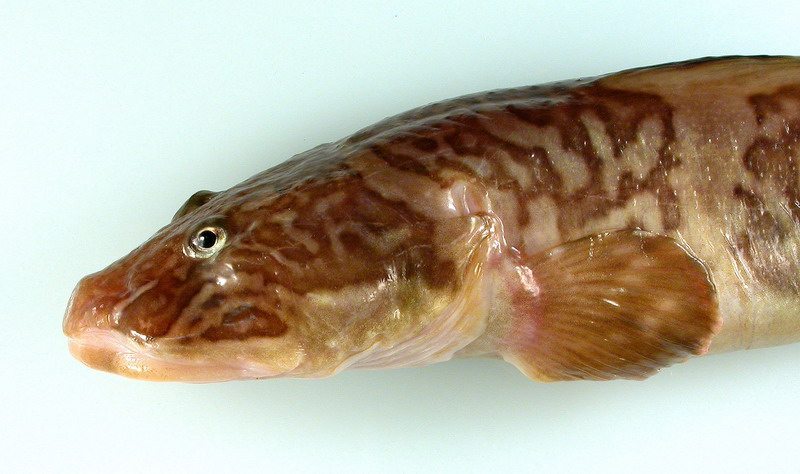
Closeup image of the skin of a marbled eel

The cross helical fiber arrangement of the two dermal fibers types collagen and elastin, are responsible for the mechanical properties of the skin such as the two dimensional stiffness seen in the eel skin. In the longitudinal direction, eel skin behaves like a pure fiber system, with a lessertensile strength than skin in the hoop direction. The skin in the hoop direction exhibits a higher elastic modulus than the skin in the longitudinal direction. The two dimensional stiffness allows for the body of the eel to be modeled a pressurized cylinder with the fiber angle of the cross helical arrangement dictating the method by which the eel moves. Eel skin behaves like skin having a fiber angle greater than 45°. In an eel with the cross helical fiber arrangement, muscle contraction in the anterior region bends the fish, and so the skin on the convex side is extended in the longitudinal direction. The extension in the longitudinal direction produces contraction in the hoop direction as the fiber angle decreases until these dimensional changes are resisted by the body of the eel. The skin becomes skin, and additional longitudinal force (applied by skin) results in force being transmitted along the tail. Therefore, changes in fiber angle of the cross helical arrangement in eel skin allows for the transmission of force through the skin during swimming. The skin act like an external tendon allowing for an eel to generate a greater propulsive force per muscle contraction. In addition to the eel skin acting as an external tendon, the skin attaches directly to the underlying muscle, which allow for the eel to generate an even greater force per muscle contraction.

==== Longnose gar ====
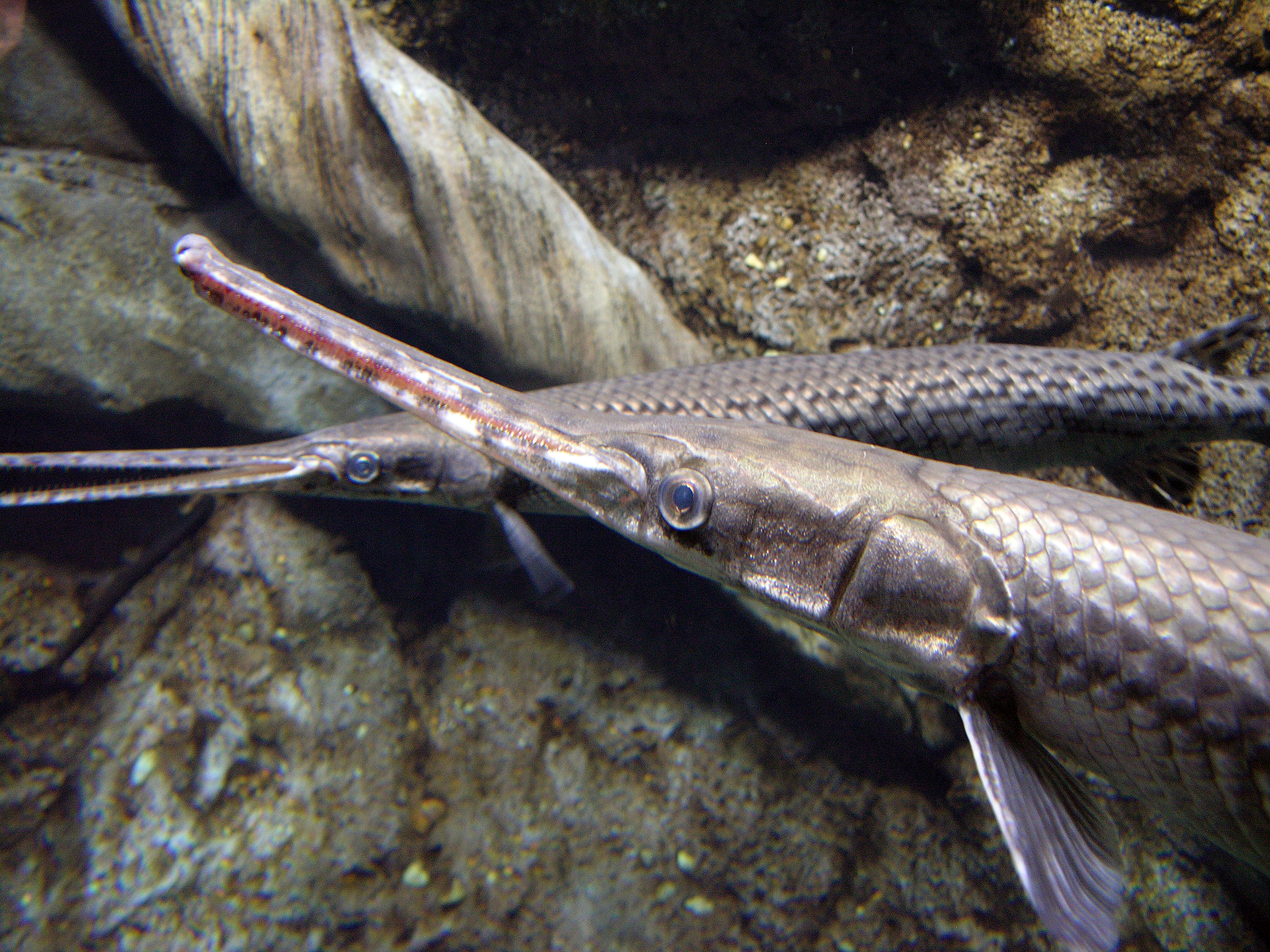
Closeup of the skin of the longnose gar

Due to the heavily scaled skin of the Longnose gar, some of the mechanical properties differ from model of describing how eel skin adds movement. The scale row resists longitudinal forces, which unlike eel skin, makes the skin stiffer in the longitudinal direction, providing myomeres with leverage and anchorage for pulling tendons. At low curvatures, it appears that the dermis is slack on both the concave and convex sides of the body. When the dermis is placed in tension, and resistance to bending is developed, which is referred to as flexural stiffness of the fish skin. The flexural stiffness is a result of the two dimensional stiffness of fish with heavily scaled skin, such as the longnose gar. This mechanical property of fish skin is important to the way a fish swims, because this mechanical property passively stiffens the body, which would otherwise would have been done muscularly. The flexural stiffness of fish skin act in a manner similar to the mechanism by which eel skin acts as an external tendon, however in the case of fish skin, the flexural stiffness acts as a mechanism to decelerate body movement rather than to generate a propulsive force.

==== Snake ====
Snakes are one of the few vertebrates in which the skin alone is sufficient for locomotion. During Rectilinear locomotion, the skeleton remains fixed, while the skin is alternately lifted and pulled forward, and then allowed to contact the ground and pulled backwards, propelling the body forward.

One of the interesting aspects of snakeskin are folds of intersquamous skin between longitudinally oriented scale rows. The function of these folds is to permit the circumference of the snake to increase, allowing prey to pass into the stomach during feeling. Snakes differ from eels in the direction in which the skin is stiffer, the dorsal scale rows are more flexible in snake than in eels because the dorsal scale row associated with stretching. Differences in the local dermal structures, such as variations in the diameters and orientation of collagen fibers within the intersquamous skin create local differences in the mechanical properties of the snake skin, thus allowing it to adapt to the stresses and strains during the feeding process.

=== Aerial locomotion ===
Gliding, Flying and Parachuting are some of the some methods of aerial locomotion used by animals. Vertebrates have altered the structure of the skin to accommodate the stresses and strains of flight. Typically mammalian skin consists of collagen fibers arranged in a felt-work pattern, with no preferential fiber orientation. However, the structures of skin in bats, birds, and gliding lizards are very different from those of typical mammalian skin. The structural arrangement of the fibers within bat wing skin enables the bat to act like a spring during the down-stroke of flapping. The scales of gliding lizards are arranged in a regular rib like pattern to enable to lizard to act as an airfoil. Avain skin must be structurally arranged such that "the coat of feathers" remains smooth and intact during flight.

==== Bats ====
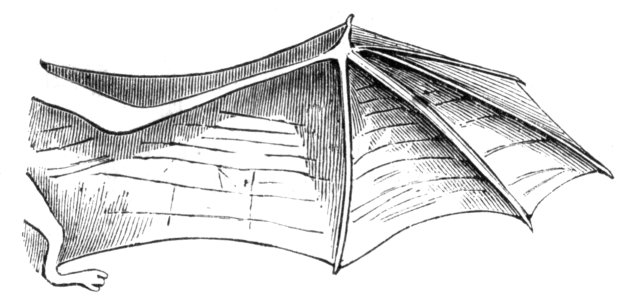
Drawing of the bat wing skin showing the fibers of "mesh like scaffolding"

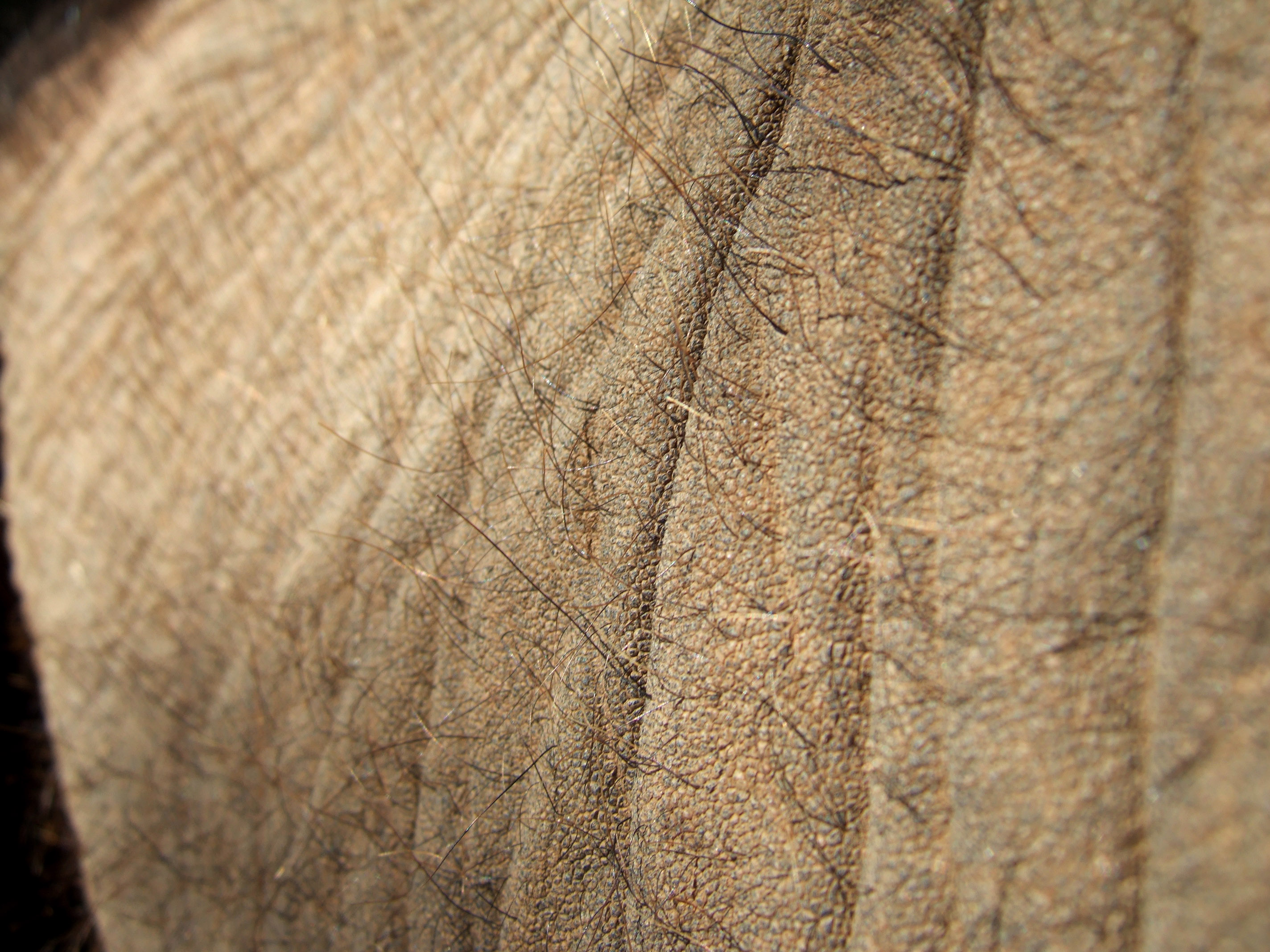
A closeup view of the felt like fiber pattern seen in elephant skin

Bats rely on skin on their wings to generate lift and thrust used in flight. Therefore, the structure of the bat wing skin is different from the skin of the bat body. Bat wing skin consists of two thin layers of epidermis with a thin layer of dermis/hypodermis located between the epidermal layers whereas the skin of the bat body consists of a single layer of epidermis with a thicker layer of dermis internal to the epidermis. Within the dermal and epidermal layer of bat wing skin, the connective tissue and muscle fibers provide the structural support. The connective tissue fibers within bat wing skin consists of collagen and elastin fiber bundles arranged in a "regular mesh like scaffolding", which the nerves, skeletal muscle fibers and blood vessels embed themselves into. Of the muscles that insert themselves into the mesh scaffolding, larger muscles anchor the skin to the bone and control the membrane tension and camber of the bat wing during flight, whereas smaller muscles, which originate from within the mesh scaffolding, attach to collagen fibers within the fiber network and modulate bone loading and allow for precise control of wing shape and tension. As seen in snakes, local structural differences within the arrangement of the fibers change the mechanical properties of local area, but there are general characteristics that describe the mechanical behavior of bat wing skin. Within the mesh scaffolding of bat wing skin, collagen fibers cross bones perpendicular to the long axes of the bones, therefore mechanical properties of bat wing skin oriented perpendicular to the long axes of the bones exhibit a lower stiffness than the skin that is oriented parallel to the long axes of the bodies. Stiffer skin is necessary for bat wing skin oriented in the direction parallel to the long axes of the bones to prevent too much deformation of bat wing skin during flight (with respect to the bone), resulting in the shearing of the bat wing skin off of the bone. Flexible skin is necessary for the direction perpendicular to the long axes of the bones for facilitating the shape changes needed for movement and control during flight. This anisotropy of bat wing skin is also useful as method of storing and releasing elastic energy, particularly during the downstroke. During the downstroke, the bat extends its wing and the wing skin experiences an aerodynamic force. The wing skin expands and counteracts the aerodynamic force. After the wing is fully extended, the orientation of the wing is nearly vertical and the aerodynamic forces on the wing are reduced. As the aerodynamic force is reduced, the wing recoils, drawing the digits of the wings together in preparation for the upstroke.

==== Gliding lizards ====
There are two different mechanisms by which lizards glide through the air. Both mechanisms involve the patagia.

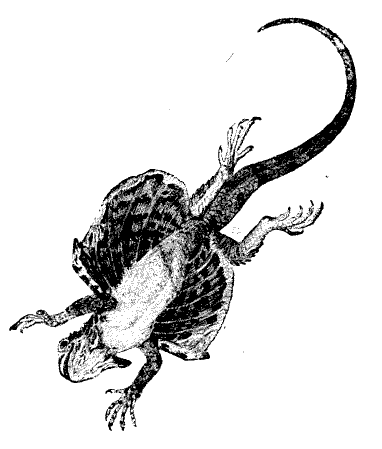
Active parachuting mechanism

In the active mechanism, skeletal supports and muscles run through the patagia of lizards. The skeletal supports and muscle erect the flight membrane and control the gliding using the patagia. Most of the lizards that exhibit this active gliding mechanism are agamine lizards such lizards in the genus Draco. For the passive mechanism of gliding in lizards, the patagia is unfurled by air pressure alone. The patagia of the passive mechanism differs from patagia of the active mechanism; there is the lack of skeleton support and musculature in patagia of the gliding lizards with the passive gliding mechanism. The passive mechanism of gliding is seen in smaller lizards such as the geckos of the genus Ptychozoon. For the passive mechanism of gliding, body movements are believed to control the descent of the gliding lizard.

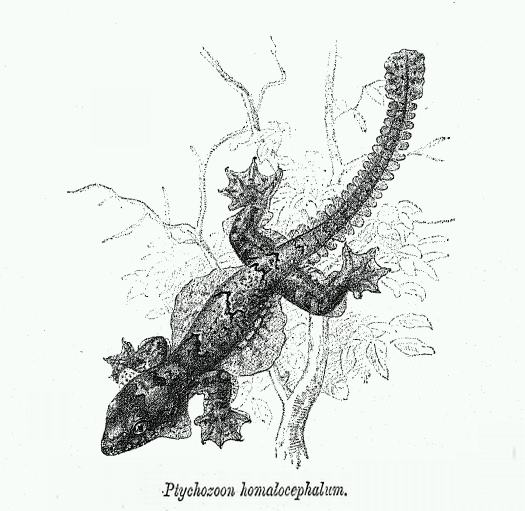
Passive parachuting mechanism

The surface area to body ratios of lizards with different gliding mechanisms are similar, but how the surface area is distributed is different. The difference in the distribution of surface area indicates the differences in the role of the patagia and accessory areas for the different flight mechanisms. Lizards with passive gliding mechanisms tend to have smaller patagia relative to lizards with active flight mechanisms. However, lizards with passive flight mechanism have, ore surface area located in accessory areas (i.e. webbed toes, tail) than lizards with the active gliding mechanism.

The structure of the skin of the patagia and accessory areas for the patagia of a Ptychozoon kuhli, flying gecko, exhibiting the passive gliding mechanism consists of five layers; a layer of adipose tissue is surrounded by a layer of dermis on each side (ventral and dorsal) and a layer of epidermis is external to the two dermal layers. The distribution of the adipose tissue IS thickest close to the body wall. This thick layer of adipose tissue at close to the body wall is believed to provide a "safety factor" for the structural elements of the skin (i.e. collagen fibers) near the body wall. The thick layer of adipose tissue is more compliant than the structural elements of the body wall (i.e. ribs, muscles), therefore will more readily deform (absorb force) before the structural elements of the skin experience a force. The layer of adipose tissue also aids in the creation of the domed and cambered shape of the patagia. With regards to the structure of the dermal layer of the patagia, there is a thick layer of collagen fibers oriented parallel to the axis of the patagial ribs. These collagen fibers act as the structural support for the shape of the patagia, and provide the stiffness necessary to resist shape change. The most prominent features of the epidermal layer of the patagia are the scales. The morphology of the dorsal scales of the patagia change as a result of their functional role. A large portion of the dorsal scales of the patagia are arranged in regular rib-like pattern, which guide the flow of air and allow for the lizard to behave as an airfoil. However at the hinge joints (places where patagia folds and attaches to limbs), the regular rib like structure of scales breakdown into a more random distribution of scales. This breakdown of scales is believed to aid in the mechanical loading of the patagia during the unfurling process and also determining the extent the patagia unfurling during flight.

==== Birds ====
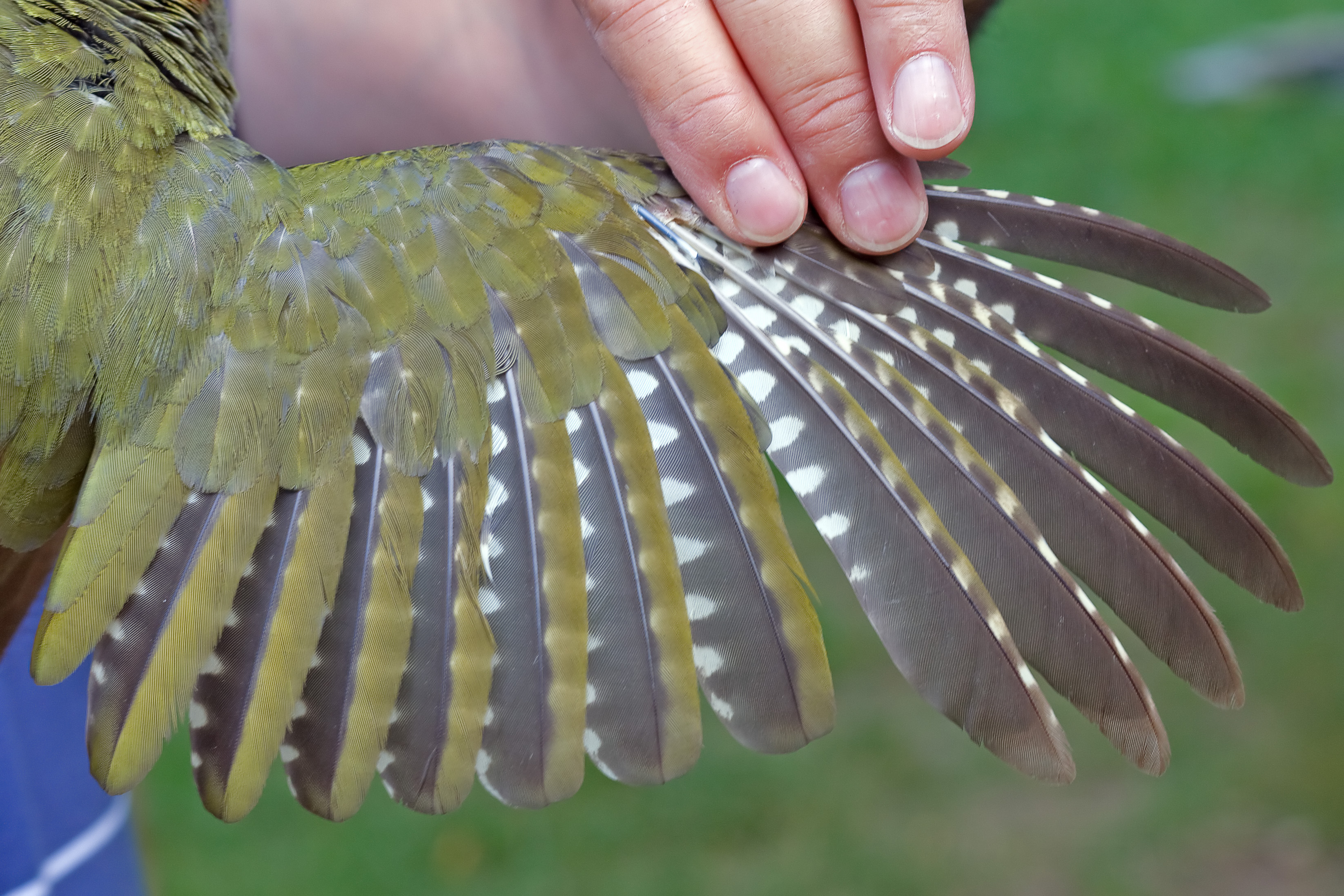
The wing of a woodpecker

Avian skin is a bit more complicated than the skin of gliding lizards or bats because the presence of feathers. In addition to the counteracting stresses and stains associated with flight, avian skin must provide a means to monitor and anchor a "coat of feathers", thus the structure of avian skin is different from skin of other flying and gliding animals. To better understand the structure of avian skin, avian skin has been broken down into three different functional components:

- hydraulic skeleto-muscular apparatus of the feathers

This functional component consists of the only of the structural features of the feather tracts, namely the cutis, and connective tissue layer fascia superficialis. This functional component was named "hydraulic skeletal" due to the fact that the fat bodies embedded within cutis and fascia act similar to the hydrostatic bodies within a hydrostatic skeleton. However the functional role of the fat bodies within the hydraulic skeleto-muscular apparatus of the feathers is to counteract forces generated by the erector and depressor muscle of the feathers tracts. rather than to facilitate movement within of a body.

- dermo-subcutaneous muscular system of integument

This functional component of avian skin consists of the smooth muscle of the apteria and striated subcutaneous muscles. The smooth muscles of the apteria counteract the horizontal forces experienced by the feather follicles. The striated subcutaneous muscles also adjust the position of the feather follicles in the directions the smooth muscle cannot. Together this system acts as an integrated muscular system that properly positions the feather tracts on the body of the bird.

- subcutaneous hydraulic skeletal system

This functional component of avian skin consists of the fat bodies of the fascia superficialis and Fascia subcutanea. The majority of the fat bodies are located either between fascia superficialis and the Fascia subcutanea. These fat bodies are stratically located at depression within the body of the bird and function to even out depressions so that feather tracts of the skeleto-muscular apparatus function properly.

== See also ==
- Bird flight
- Fish locomotion
- Hydrostatic skeleton
- Muscular hydrostat
