= Keratin-associated protein =

Keratin-associated proteins (KRTAPs, KAPs) and keratins are the major components of hair and nails. The content of KRTAPs in hair varies considerably between species, ranging from less than 3% in human hair to 30–40% in echidna quill. Both keratin and KRTAPs are extensively cross-linked in hair through disulfide bonds via numerous cysteine residues in keratins. Given the economic importance of wool, the KRTAP family has been studied intensively in sheep.

== Genetics ==
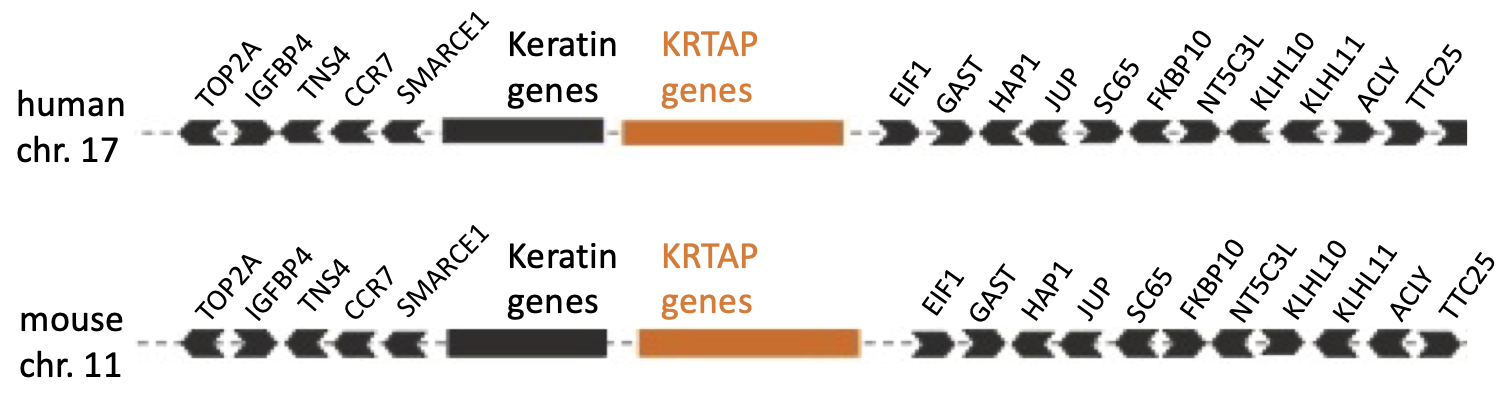
Syntenic gene organization of keratin and keratin-associated proteins on human chromosome 17 and mouse chromosome 11. Based on Wu & Irwin (2018).

The KRTAP family of genes is unique to mammals. The family has evolved rapidly with about 188 genes in the mouse genome, 175 in the sloth, 122 in humans, but only 35 in dolphins (where only 9 genes are functional). In humans, there are 101 intact KRTAP genes and 21 (non-functional) pseudogenes. There are two major groups of KRTAP genes: high/ultrahigh cysteine (HS-KRTAP) and high glycine-tyrosine (HGT-KRTAP), that are thought to have independently originated based on their distinct amino acid compositions.

=== Human KRTAP loci ===
The KRTAP locus on human chromosome 17 includes the following 40 genes (in this order on the chromosome; lower-case "p" indicates pseudogenes): KRTAP3-3, KRTAP3-2, KRTAP3p1, KRTAP3-1, KRTAP1-5, KRTAP1-4, KRTAP1-3, KRTAP1-1, KRTAP2-1, KRTAP2-2, KRTAP2-3, KRTAP2-4, KRTAP4p2, KRTAP4-7, KRTAP4-8, KRTAP4p1, KRTAP4-9, KRTAP4-11, KRTAP4-12, KRTAP4-6, KRTAP4-5, KRTAP4-4, KRTAP4-3, KRTAP4-2, KRTAP4-1, KRTAP4p3, KRTAP9-1, KRTAP9-9, KRTAP9-2, KRTAP9-3, KRTAP9-8, KRTAP9-4, KRTAP9-5, KRTAP9-6, KRTAP9-12 KRTAP9-7, KRTAP9-10, KRTAP29-1, KRTAP16-1, and KRTAP17-1.

Similarly, the KRTAP locus on human chromosome 21 contains the following genes: KRTAP24-1, KRTAP25-1, KRTAP26-1, KRTAP27-1, KRTAP13-6, KRTAP13p2, KRTAP13-2, KRTAP13-1, KRTAP13-3, KRTAP13-4, KRTAP13p1, KRTAP13-5, KRTAP19-1, KRTAP19-2, KRTAP19-3, KRTAP19-4, KRTAP19-5, KRTAP19p1, KRTAP19p2, KRTAP19p3, KRTAP19-6, KRTAP19p5, KRTAP19-7, KRTAP6-3, KRTAP6-2, KRTAP19-9, KRTAP6-1, KRTAP20-1, KRTAP20-2, KRTAP19p4, KRTAP21p1, KRTAP21-2, KRTAP21-1, KRTAP8p1, KRTAP8p2, KRTAP8-1, KRTAP7p1, KRTAP11-1, KRTAP19-8, KRTAP10-1, KRTAP10-2, KRTAP10-3, KRTAP10-4, KRTAP10-5, KRTAP10-6, KRTAP10-7, KRTAP10-8, KRTAP10-9, KRTAP10-10, KRTAP10-11, KRTAP12-4, KRTAP12-3, KRTAP12-2, KRTAP12-1, KRTAP12p1, KRTAP10-12, KRTAP10p1.

The other KRTAP genes form similar, but smaller clusters on chromosomes 2 and 11.

It has been proposed to change the protein names from KRTAP to KAP, with the numbering scheme remaining the same. However, the gene names would remain the same (KRTAPx-x etc.).

== See also ==
- Human chromosome 17
- Keratin
- Keratin-associated protein 5-6
