= Hair =

Protein filament that grows from follicles found in the dermis, or skin

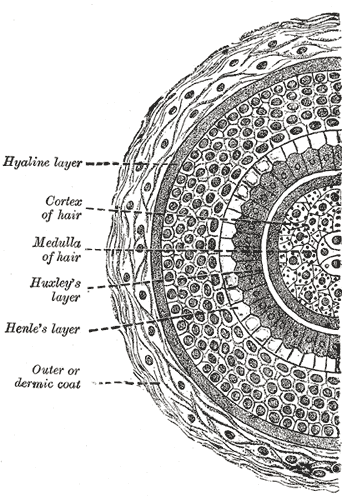
- Cross section of a human hair strand

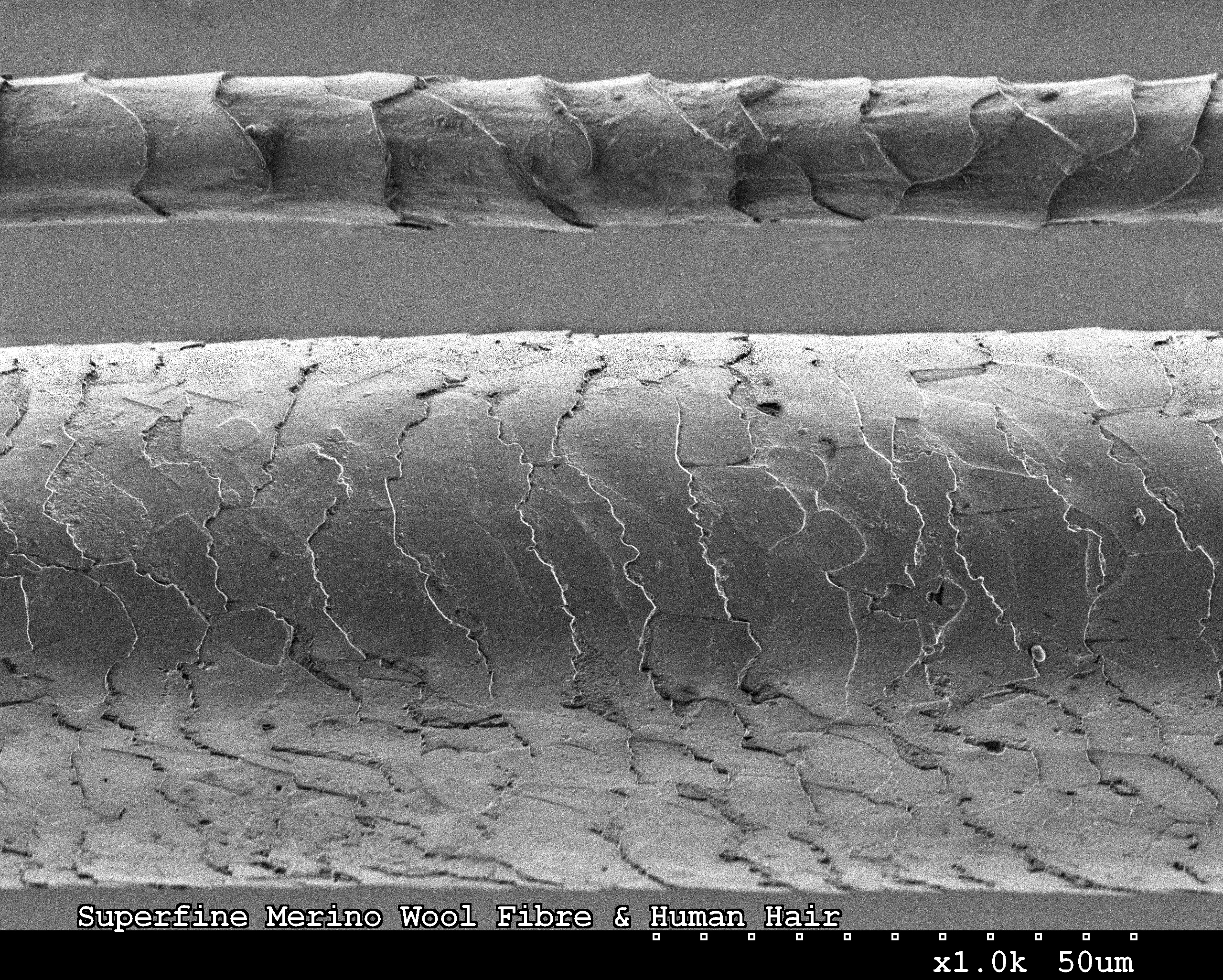
- Scanning electron microscopy image of Merino wool (top) and human hair (bottom) showing keratin scales

Details
- System: Integumentary system

Identifiers
- Latin: capillum
- Greek: θρίξ (thríx)
- MeSH: D006197
- TA98: A16.0.00.014
- TA2: 7053
- TH: H3.12.00.3.02001
- FMA: 53667

Hair is a protein filament that grows from follicles found in the dermis. Hair is one of the distinguishing characteristics of mammals. The human body, apart from areas of glabrous skin, is covered in follicles which produce thick terminal and fine vellus hair. Most common interest in hair is focused on hair growth, hair types, and hair care, but hair is also an important biomaterial primarily composed of protein, notably alpha-keratin.

Attitudes towards different forms of hair, such as hairstyles and hair removal, vary widely across different cultures and historical periods, but it is often used to indicate a person's personal beliefs or social position, such as their age, gender, or religion.

== Overview ==
=== Meaning ===
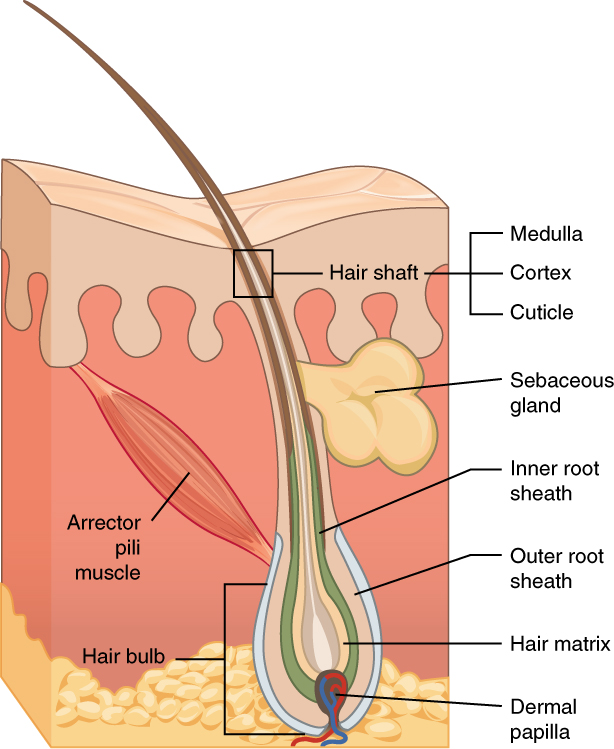
Anatomy of the hair shaft and bulb.

The word "hair" usually refers to two distinct structures:

1. the part beneath the skin, called the hair follicle, or, when pulled from the skin, the bulb or root. This organ is located in the dermis and maintains stem cells, which not only re-grow the hair after it falls out, but also are recruited to regrow skin after a wound.
2. the hair shaft, which is the hard filamentous part that extends above the skin surface. It is made of multi-layered keratinized (dead) flat cells whose rope-like filaments provide structure and strength to it. The protein called keratin makes up most of its volume. A cross section of the hair shaft may be divided roughly into three zones.

Hair fibers have a structure consisting of several layers, starting from the outside:

1. the cuticle, which consists of several layers of flat, thin cells laid out overlapping one another as roof shingles
2. the cortex, which contains the keratin bundles in cell structures that remain roughly rod-like
3. the medulla, a disorganized and open area at the fiber's center

=== Etymology ===
The word "hair" is derived from Middle English: heer and hêr, in turn derived from Old English: hǽr and hér, with influence from Old Norse: hár. Both the Old English and Old Norse words derive from Proto-Germanic: *hēran and are related to terms for hair in other Germanic languages such as Swedish: hår, Dutch and German: haar, and Old Frisian: her. The now broadly obsolete word "fax" refers specifically to head hair and is found in compounds such as Fairfax and Halifax. It is derived from Old English: feax and is cognate with terms such as Old Norse and Norwegian: fax.

== Description ==
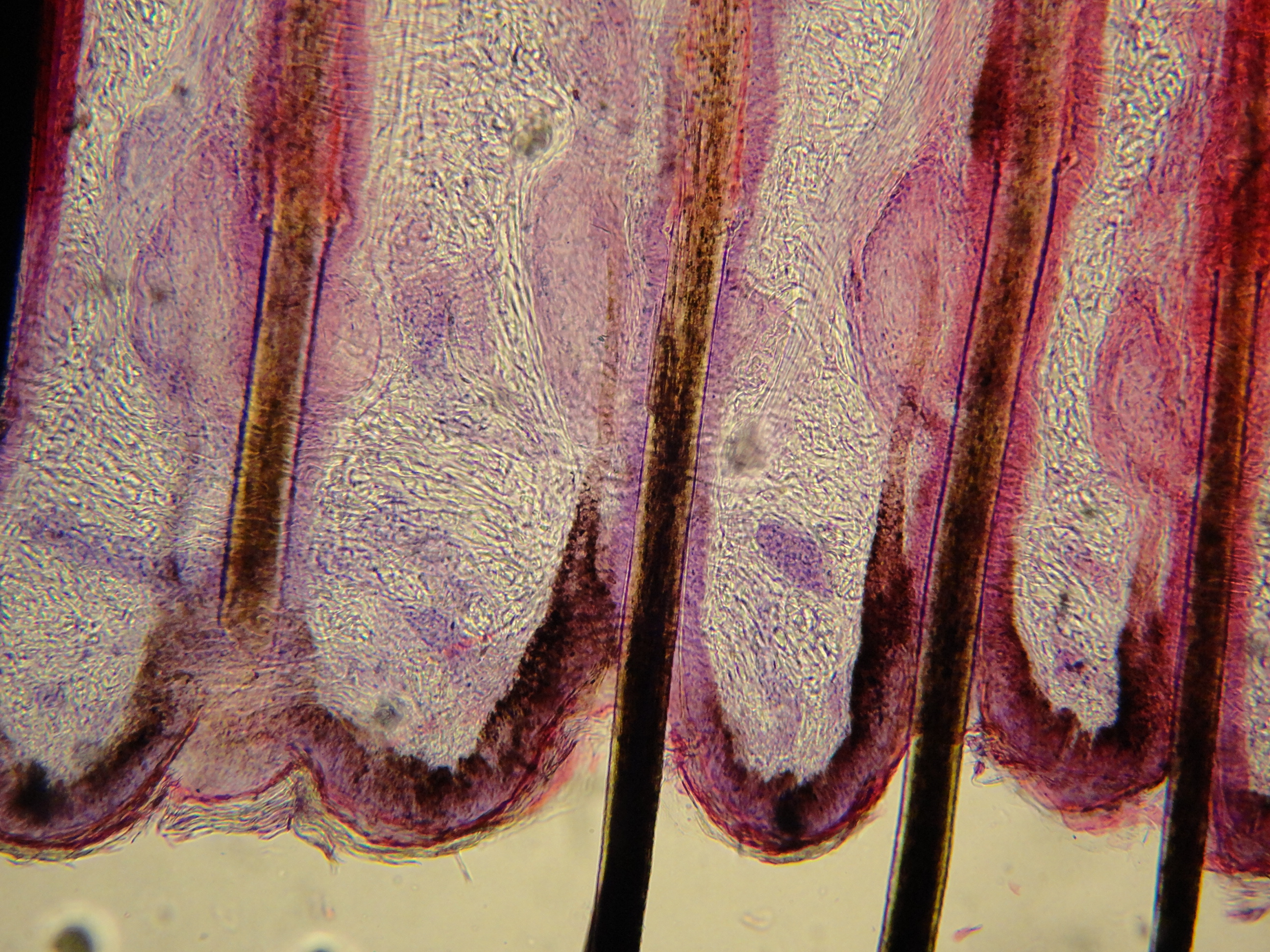
Hair follicle of a Felid.

Each strand of hair is made up of the medulla, cortex, and cuticle. The innermost region, the medulla, is an open and unstructured region that is not always present. The highly structural and organized cortex, or second of three layers of the hair, is the primary source of mechanical strength and water uptake. The cortex contains melanin, which colors the fiber based on the number, distribution and types of melanin granules. The melanin may be evenly spaced or cluster around the edges of the hair. The shape of the follicle determines the shape of the cortex, and the shape of the fiber is related to how straight or curly the hair is. People with straight hair have round hair fibers. Oval and other shaped fibers are generally more wavy or curly. The cuticle is the outer covering. Its complex structure slides as the hair swells and is covered with a single molecular layer of lipid that makes the hair repel water. The diameter of human hair varies from 0.017 to 0.18 millimeters (0.00067 to 0.00709 in). Some of these characteristics in humans' head hair vary by race: people of mostly African ancestry tend to have hair with a diameter of 60–90 μm and a flat cross-section, while people of mostly European or Middle Eastern ancestry tend to have hair with a diameter of 70–100 μm and an oval cross-section, and people of mostly Asian or Native American ancestry tend to have hair with a diameter of 90–120 μm and a round cross-section. There are roughly two million small, tubular glands and sweat glands that produce watery fluids that cool the body by evaporation. The glands at the opening of the hair produce a fatty secretion that lubricates the hair.

Hair growth begins inside the hair follicle. The only "living" portion of the hair is found in the follicle. The hair that is visible is the hair shaft, which exhibits no biochemical activity and is considered "dead". The base of a hair's root (the "bulb") contains the cells that produce the hair shaft. Other structures of the hair follicle include the oil producing sebaceous gland which lubricates the hair and the arrector pili muscles, which are responsible for causing hairs to stand up. In humans with little body hair, the effect results in goose bumps.

=== Root of the hair ===
Root of the hair
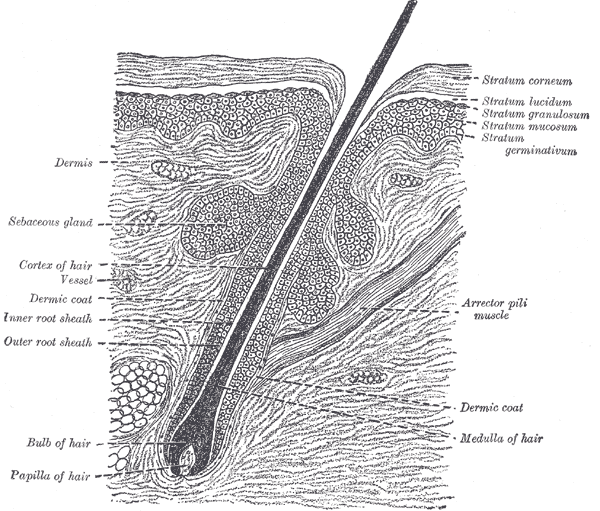
- Section of skin, showing the epidermis and dermis; a hair in its follicle; the arrector pili muscle; sebaceous glands.

Details

Identifiers
- Latin: radix pili
- MeSH: D006197
- TA98: A16.0.00.014
- TA2: 7053
- TH: H3.12.00.3.02001
- FMA: 53667

The root of the hair ends in an enlargement, the hair bulb, which is whiter in color and softer in texture than the shaft and is lodged in a follicular involution of the epidermis called the hair follicle. The bulb of hair consists of fibrous connective tissue, glassy membrane, external root sheath, internal root sheath composed of epithelium stratum (Henle's layer) and granular stratum (Huxley's layer), cuticle, cortex and medulla.

=== Natural color ===
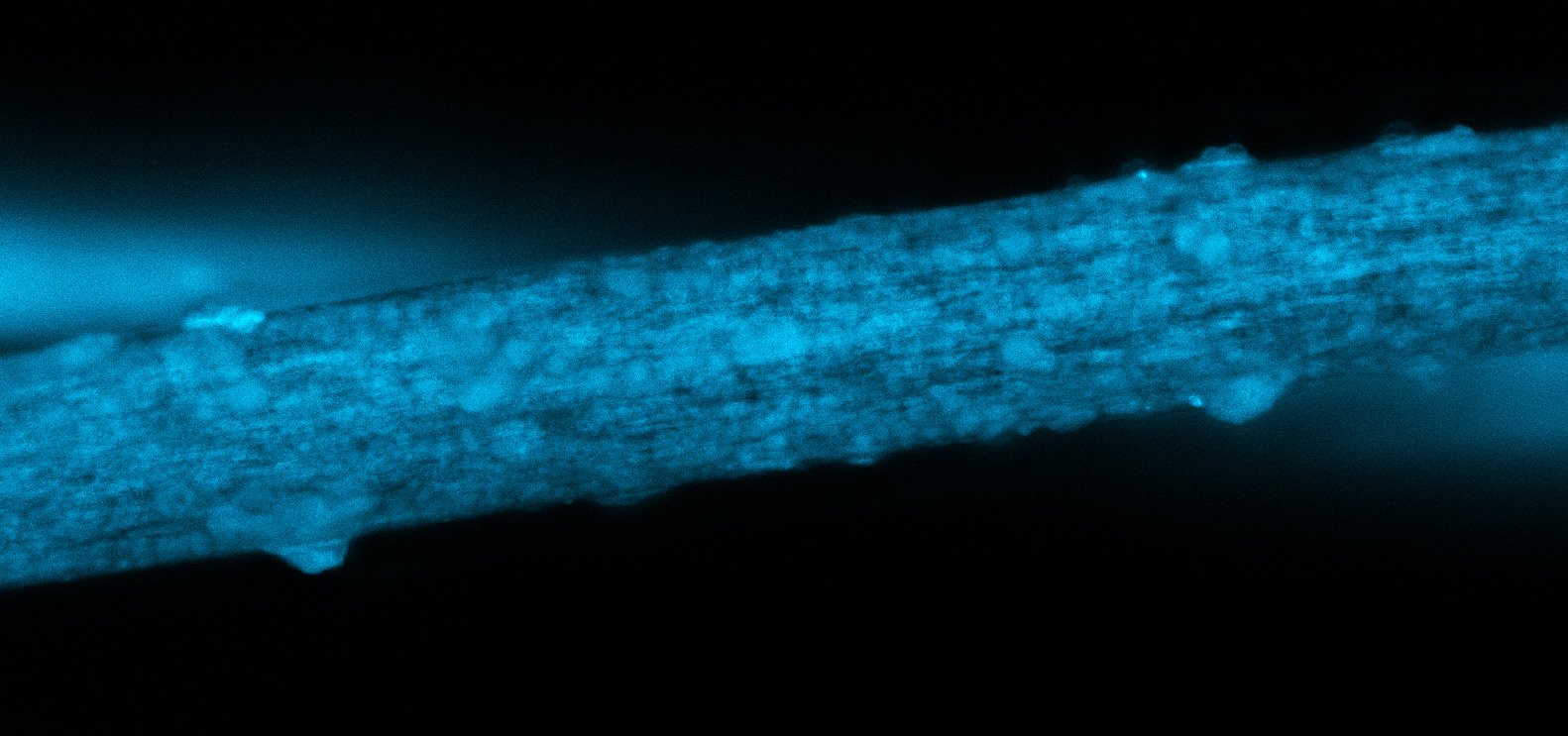
Human hair contains melanin which provides dark coloration and protection from UV radiation. Human hair can absorb and emit light across a wide range of wavelengths. The image above depicts melanin autofluorescence at 365-400 nm excitation from a strand of dark brown human hair.

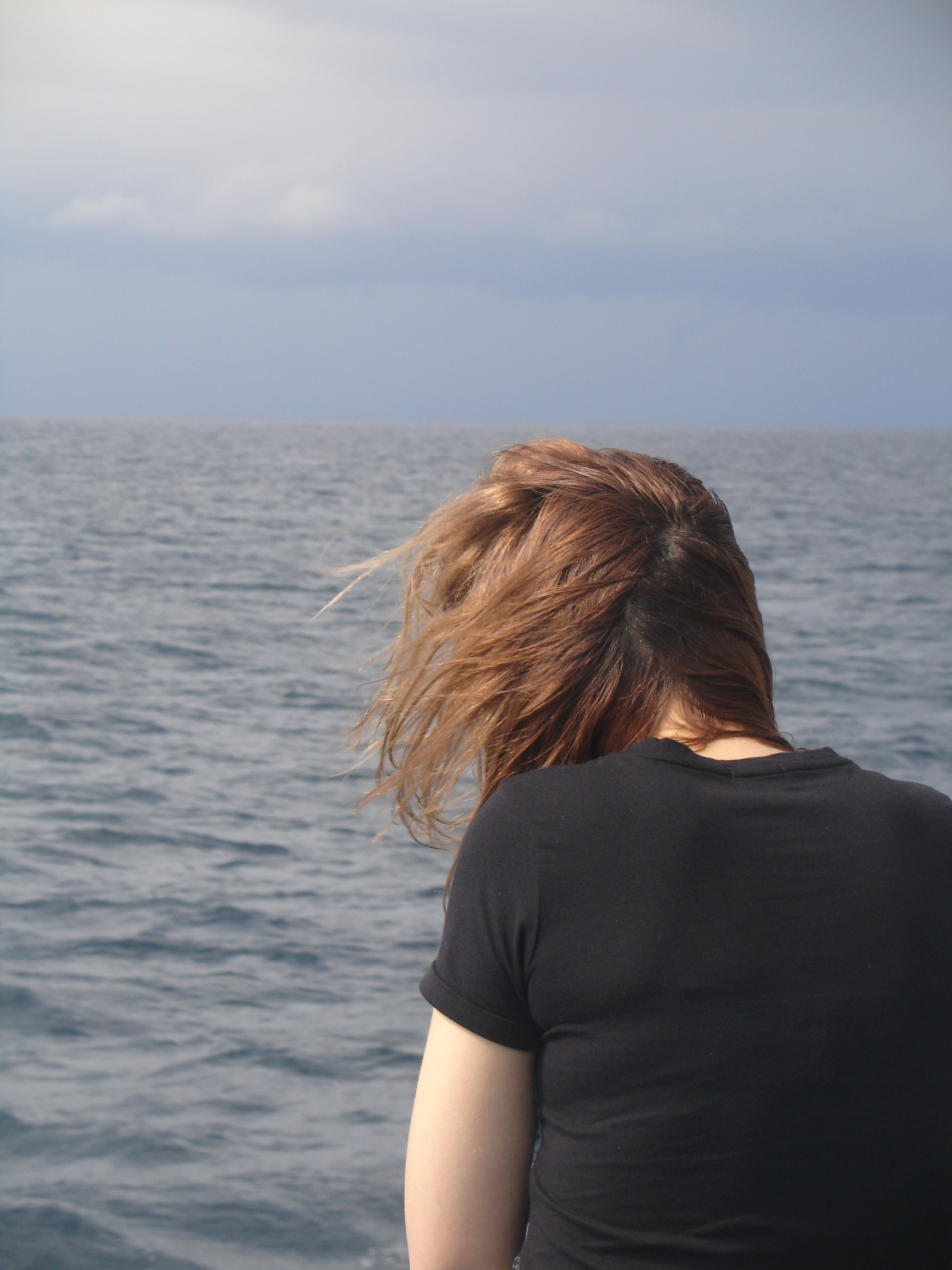
A girl with reddish brown hair

All natural hair colors are the result of two types of hair pigments. Both of these pigments are melanin types, produced inside the hair follicle and packed into granules found in the fibers. Eumelanin is the dominant pigment in brown hair and black hair, while pheomelanin is dominant in red hair. Blond hair is the result of having little pigmentation in the hair strand. Gray hair occurs when melanin production decreases or stops, while poliosis is white hair (and often the skin to which the hair is attached), typically in spots that never possessed melanin at all, or ceased for natural reasons, generally genetic, in the first years of life.

=== Human hair growth ===
Hair grows everywhere on the external body except for mucous membranes and glabrous skin, such as that found on the palms of the hands, soles of the feet, and lips. The body has different types of hair, including vellus hair and androgenic hair, each with its own type of cellular construction. The different construction gives the hair unique characteristics, serving specific purposes, mainly, warmth and protection.

Hair-follicle cycling

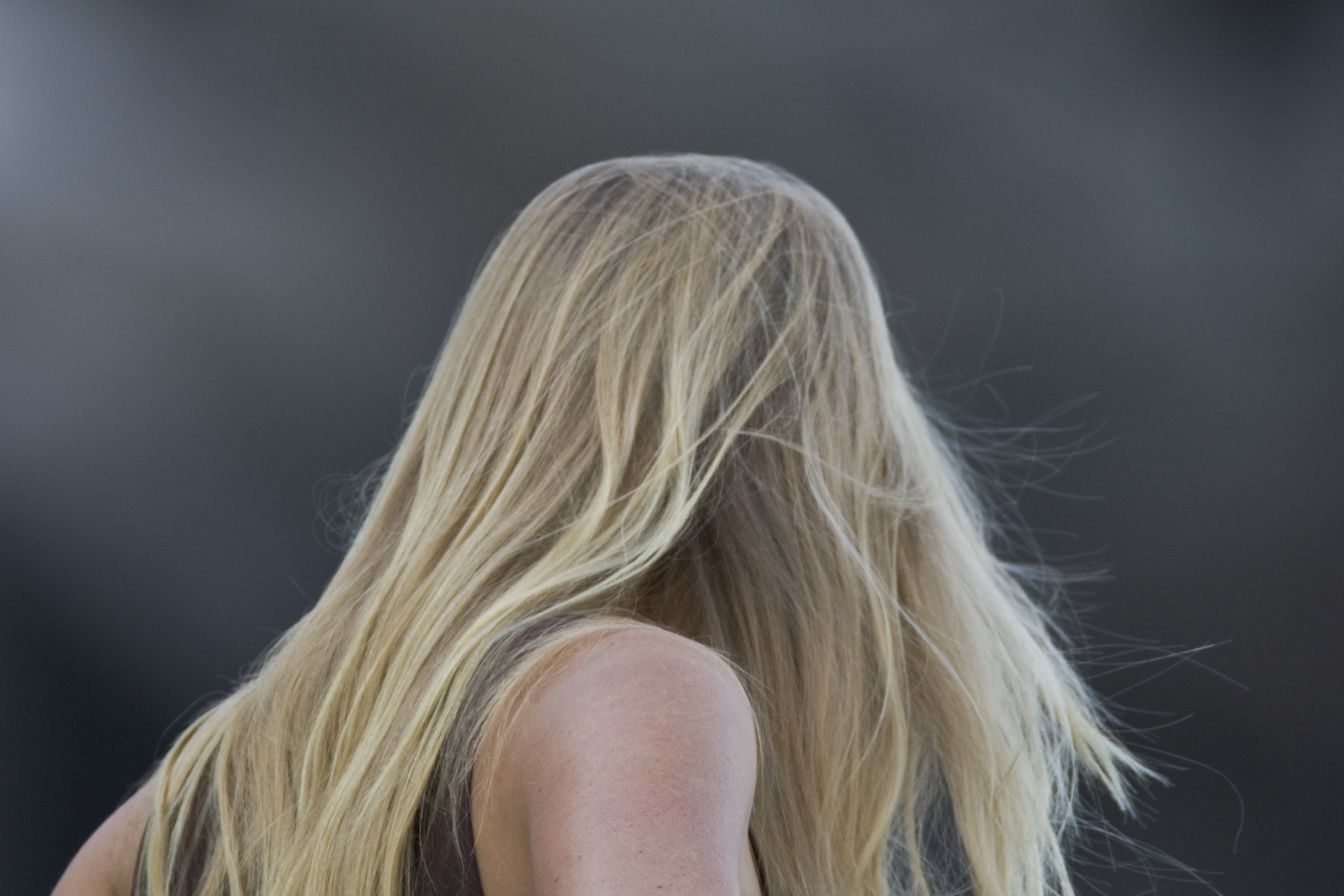
Hair grows at different speeds and different lengths. Its composition causes different colors and textures, which influence how long the hair strands grow.

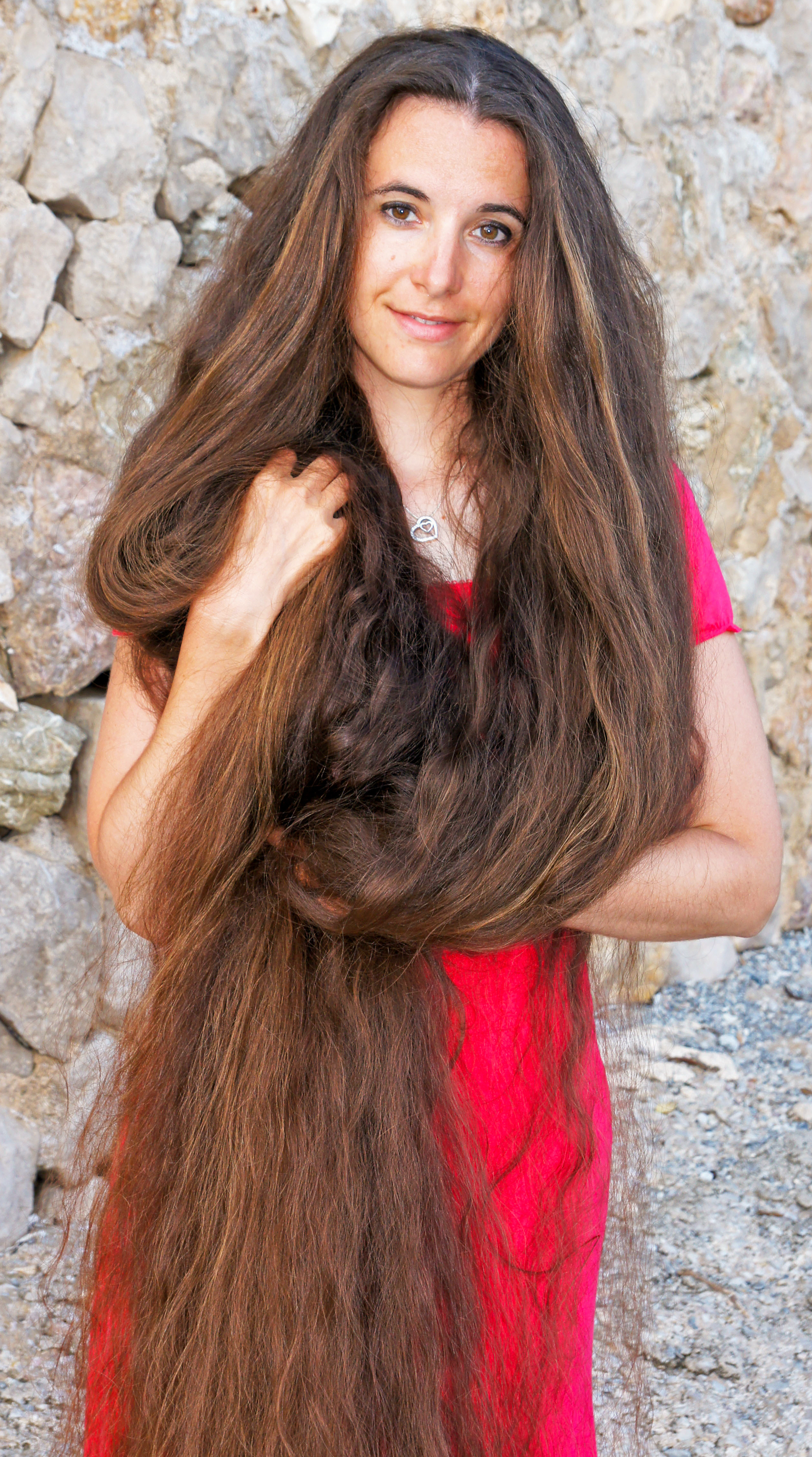
Marianne Ernst, a German "Long hair model".

The three stages of hair growth are the anagen, catagen, and telogen phases. Each strand of hair on the human body is at its own stage of development. Once the cycle is complete, it restarts and a new strand of hair begins to form. The growth rate of hair varies from individual to individual depending on their age, genetic predisposition and a number of environmental factors. It is commonly stated that hair grows about 1 cm per month on average; however reality is more complex, since not all hair grows at once. Scalp hair was reported to grow between 0.6 cm and 3.36 cm per month. The growth rate of scalp hair somewhat depends on age (hair tends to grow more slowly with age), sex, and ethnicity. Thicker hair (>60 μm) grows generally faster (11.4 mm per month) than thinner (20-30 μm) hair (7.6 mm per month).

It was previously thought that Caucasian hair grew more quickly than Asian hair and that the growth rate of women's hair was faster than that of men. However, more recent research has shown that the growth rate of hair in men and women does not significantly differ and that the hair of Chinese people grew more quickly than the hair of French Caucasians and West and Central Africans. The quantity of hair hovers in a certain range depending on hair colour. An average blonde person has 150,000 hairs, a brown-haired person has 110,000, a black-haired person has 100,000, and a redhead has 90,000. Hair growth stops after a human's death. Visible growth of hair on the dead body happens only because of skin drying out due to water loss.

The world record for longest hair on a living person stands with Smita Srivastava of Uttar Pradesh, India. At 7 feet and 9 inches long, she broke a Guinness World Record in November 2023, having grown her hair for 32 years.

=== Texture ===
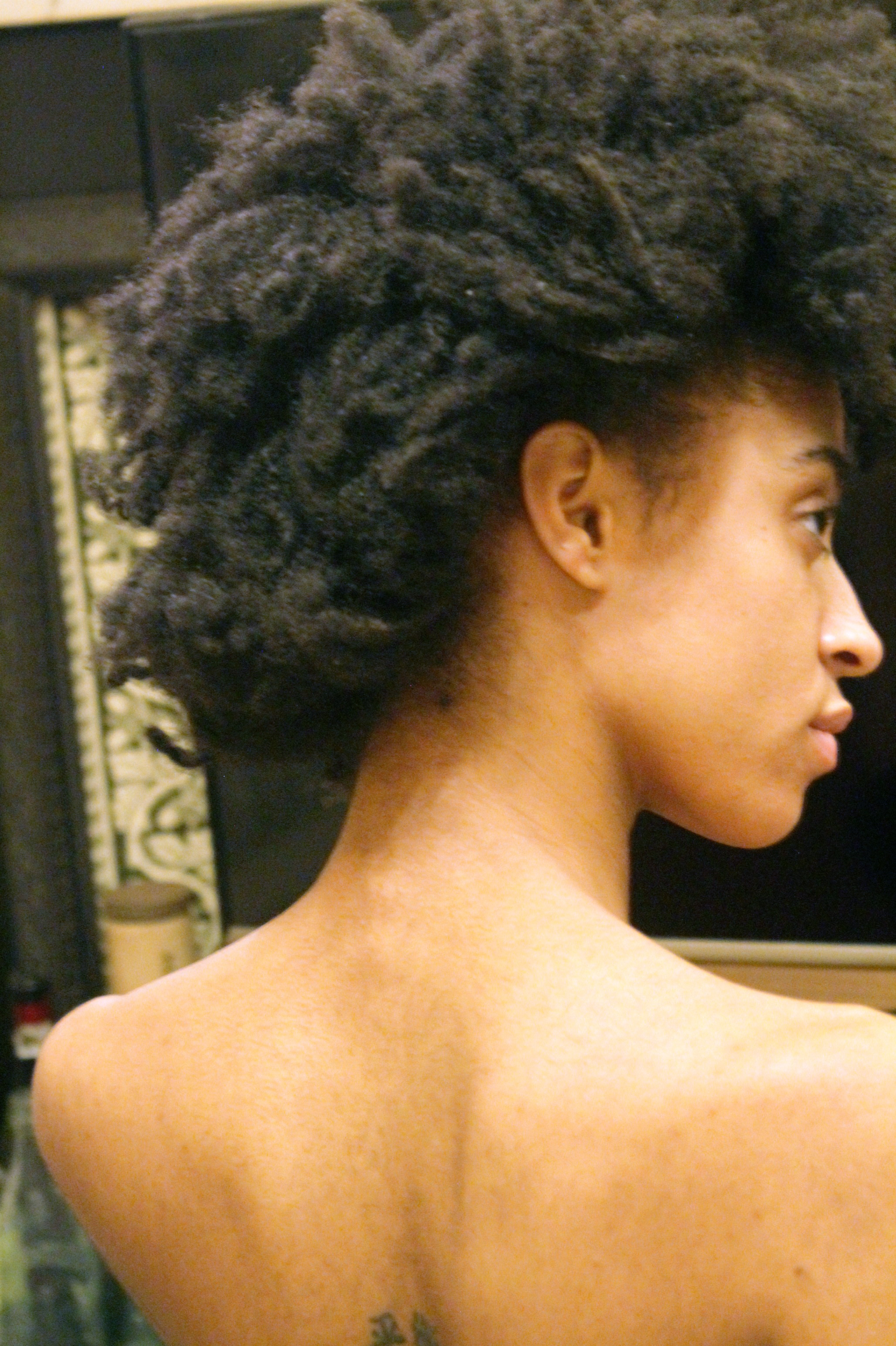
Hair type 4c

Hair exists in a variety of textures. Three main aspects of hair texture are the curl pattern, volume, and consistency. All mammalian hair is composed of keratin, so the make-up of hair follicles is not the source of varying hair patterns. There are a range of theories pertaining to the curl patterns of hair. Scientists have come to believe that the shape of the hair shaft has an effect on the curliness of the individual's hair. A very round shaft allows for fewer disulfide bonds to be present in the hair strand. This means the bonds present are directly in line with one another, resulting in straight hair.

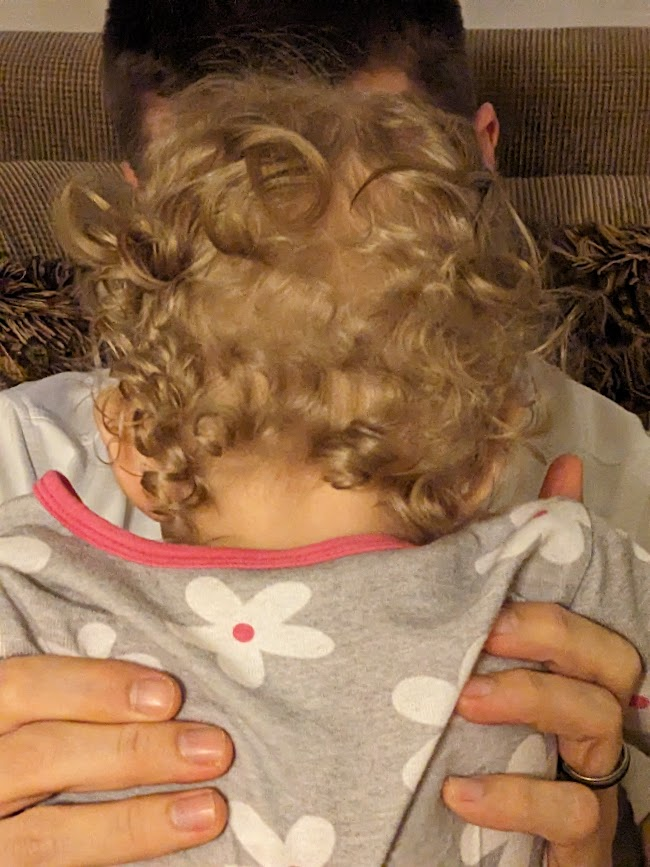
Toddler with curly hair

The flatter the hair shaft becomes, the curlier hair gets, because the shape allows more cysteines to become compacted together resulting in a bent shape that, with every additional disulfide bond, becomes curlier in form. As the hair follicle shape determines curl pattern, the hair follicle size determines thickness. While the circumference of the hair follicle expands, so does the thickness of the hair follicle. An individual's hair volume, as a result, can be thin, normal, or thick. The consistency of hair can almost always be grouped into three categories: fine, medium, and coarse. This trait is determined by the hair follicle volume and the condition of the strand. Fine hair has the smallest circumference, coarse hair has the largest circumference, and medium hair is anywhere between the other two. Coarse hair has a more open cuticle than thin or medium hair, causing it to be the most porous.

==== Classification systems ====
There are various systems that people use to classify their curl patterns. Being knowledgeable of an individual's hair type is a good start to knowing how to take care of one's hair. There is not just one method to discovering one's hair type. Additionally, it is possible and quite normal to have more than one kind of hair type, for instance having a mixture of both type 3a and 3b curls.

===== Andre Walker system =====
The Andre Walker Hair Typing System is the most widely used system to classify hair. The system was created by Oprah Winfrey's hairstylist, Andre Walker. According to this system there are four types of hair: straight, wavy, curly, and kinky.

- Type 1 is straight hair, which reflects the most sheen and also the most resilient hair of all of the hair types. It is hard to damage and immensely difficult to curl this hair texture. Because the sebum easily spreads from the scalp to the ends without curls or kinks to interrupt its path, it is the most oily hair texture of all.
- Type 2 is wavy hair, whose texture and sheen ranges somewhere between straight and curly hair. Wavy hair is also more likely to become frizzy than straight hair. While type A waves can easily alternate between straight and curly styles, type B and C wavy hair is resistant to styling.
- Type 3 is curly hair known to have an S-shape. The curl pattern may resemble a lowercase "s", uppercase "S", or sometimes an uppercase "Z" or lowercase "z". Lack of proper care causes less defined curls.
- Type 4 is kinky hair, which features a tightly coiled curl pattern (or no discernible curl pattern at all) that is often fragile with a very high density. This type of hair shrinks when wet, and because it has fewer cuticle layers than other hair types, it is more susceptible to damage.

Andre Walker hair types
Type 1: Straight
1a	Straight (Fine/Thin)	Hair tends to be very soft, thin, shiny, oily, poor at holding curls, difficult to damage.
1b	Straight (Medium)	Hair characterized by volume and body.
1c	Straight (Coarse)	Hair tends to be bone-straight, coarse, difficult to curl.
Type 2: Wavy
2a	Wavy (Fine/Thin)	Hair has definite "S" pattern, can easily be straightened or curled, usually receptive to a variety of styles.
2b	Wavy (Medium)	Can tend to be frizzy and a little resistant to styling.
2c	Wavy (Coarse)	Fairly coarse, frizzy or very frizzy with thicker waves, often more resistant to styling.
Type 3: Curly
3a	Curly (Loose)	Presents a definite "S" pattern, tends to combine thickness, volume, and/or frizziness.
3b	Curly (Tight)	Presents a definite "S" pattern, curls ranging from spirals to spiral-shaped corkscrews.
Type 4: Kinky
4a	Kinky (Soft)	Hair tends to be very wiry and fragile, tightly coiled and can feature curly patterning.
4b	Kinky (Wiry)	As 4a but with less defined pattern of curls, looks more like a "Z" with sharp angles.

===== FIA system =====
This is a method which classifies the hair by curl pattern, hair-strand thickness and overall hair volume.

FIA hair classification
Curliness
Straight
1a	Stick-straight.	
1b	Straight but with a slight body wave adding some volume.	
1c	Straight with body wave and one or two visible S-waves (e.g. at nape of neck or temples).	
Wavy
2a	Loose with stretched S-waves throughout.	
2b	Shorter with more distinct S-waves (resembling e.g. braided damp hair).	
2c	Distinct S-waves, some spiral curling.	
Curly
3a	Big, loose spiral curls.	
3b	Bouncy ringlets.	
3c	Tight corkscrews.	
Very ("Really") curly
4a	Tightly coiled S-curls.	
4b	Z-patterned (tightly coiled, sharply angled)	
4c	Mostly Z-patterned (tightly kinked, less definition)	
Strands
F	Fine Thin strands that sometimes are almost translucent when held up to the light. Shed strands can be hard to see even against a contrasting background. Fine hair is difficult to feel or it feels like an ultra-fine strand of silk.	
M	Medium Strands are neither fine nor coarse. Medium hair feels like a cotton thread, but is not stiff or rough. It is neither fine nor coarse.	
C	Coarse Thick strands whose shed strands usually are easily identified. Coarse hair feels hard and wiry.	
Volume by circumference of full-hair ponytail
i	Thin	Circumference less than 2 inches (5.1 centimetres)
ii	Normal	... from 2 to 4 inches (5.1 to 10.2 centimetres)
iii	Thick	... more than 4 inches (10 centimetres)

== Composition ==
Hair is mainly composed of keratin proteins and keratin-associated proteins (KRTAPs). The human genome encodes 54 different keratin proteins which are present in various amounts in hair. Similarly, humans encode more than 100 different KRTAPs which crosslink keratins in hair. The content of KRTAPs ranges from less than 3% in human hair to 30–40% in echidna quill.

Hair is composed of long (50-100 micrometer) cells full of keratin complexes called intermediate filaments bound together by "keratin associated proteins", which are irregular in structure. The whole bound assembly is called a macro-fibril. The long cells containing the macro-fibrils are bound by the "cell membrane complex". Located between cells, this consists generally of a 15 nm proteinous "delta layer" between two 5 nm lipid "beta layers". Much speculation exists as to the exact structure of these layers. The cell membrane complex is different between two cortex cells, between two cuticle cells, and between a cortex and a cuticle cell.

== Functions ==
Many mammals have fur and other hairs that serve different functions. Hair provides thermal regulation and camouflage for many animals; for others it provides signals to other animals such as warnings, mating, or other communicative displays; and for some animals hair provides defensive functions and, rarely, even offensive protection. Hair also has a sensory function, extending the sense of touch beyond the surface of the skin. Guard hairs give warnings that may trigger a recoiling reaction.

=== Warmth ===
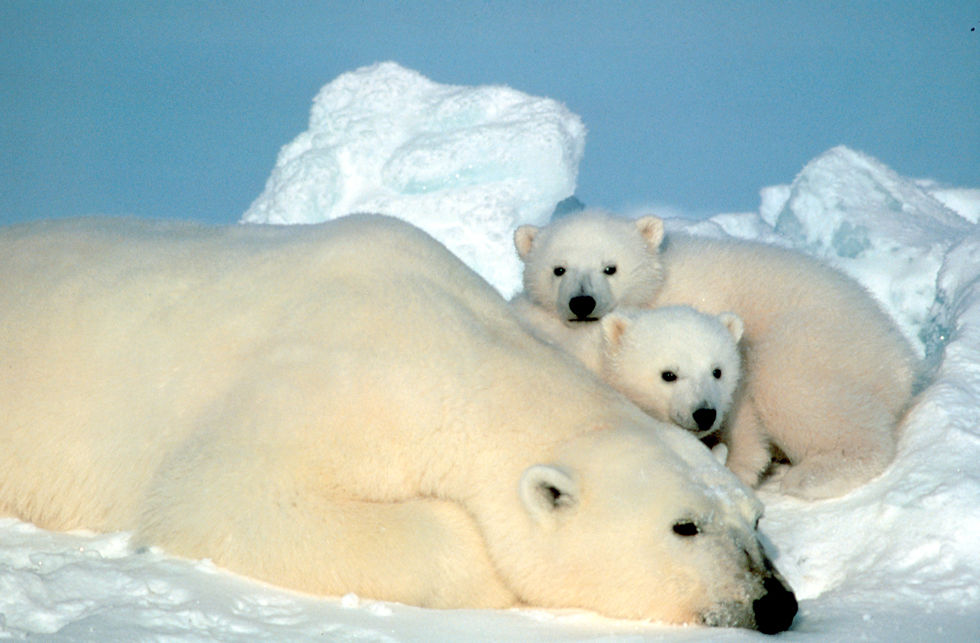
Polar bears use their fur for warmth and while their skin is black, their transparent fur appears white and provides camouflage while hunting and serves as protection by hiding cubs in the snow.

While humans have developed clothing and other means of keeping warm, the hair found on the head serves primarily as a source of heat insulation and cooling (when sweat evaporates from soaked hair) as well as protection from ultra-violet radiation exposure. The function of hair in other locations is debated. Hats and coats are still required while doing outdoor activities in cold weather to prevent frostbite and hypothermia, but the hair on the human body does help to keep the internal temperature regulated. When the body is too cold, the arrector pili muscles found attached to hair follicles stand up, causing the hair in these follicles to do the same. These hairs then form a heat-trapping layer above the epidermis. This process is formally called piloerection, derived from the Latin words 'pilus' ('hair') and 'erectio' ('rising up'), but is more commonly known as 'having goose bumps' in English. This is more effective in other mammals whose fur fluffs up to create air pockets between hairs that insulate the body from the cold. The opposite actions occur when the body is too warm; the arrector muscles make the hair lie flat on the skin which allows heat to leave.

=== Protection ===
In some mammals, such as hedgehogs and porcupines, the hairs have been modified into hard spines or quills. These are covered with thick plates of keratin and serve as protection against predators. Thick hair such as that of the lion's mane and grizzly bear's fur do offer some protection from physical damages such as bites and scratches.

=== Touch sense ===
Displacement and vibration of hair shafts are detected by hair follicle nerve receptors and nerve receptors within the skin. Hairs can sense movements of air as well as touch by physical objects and they provide sensory awareness of the presence of ectoparasites. Some hairs, such as eyelashes, are especially sensitive to the presence of potentially harmful matter.

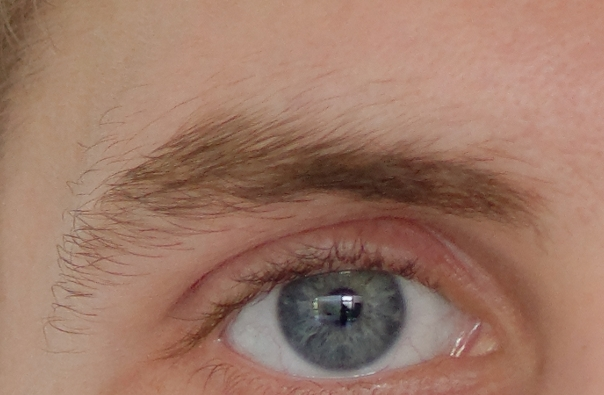
Eyebrows prevent sweat, water, and other debris from above from falling down into the eye.

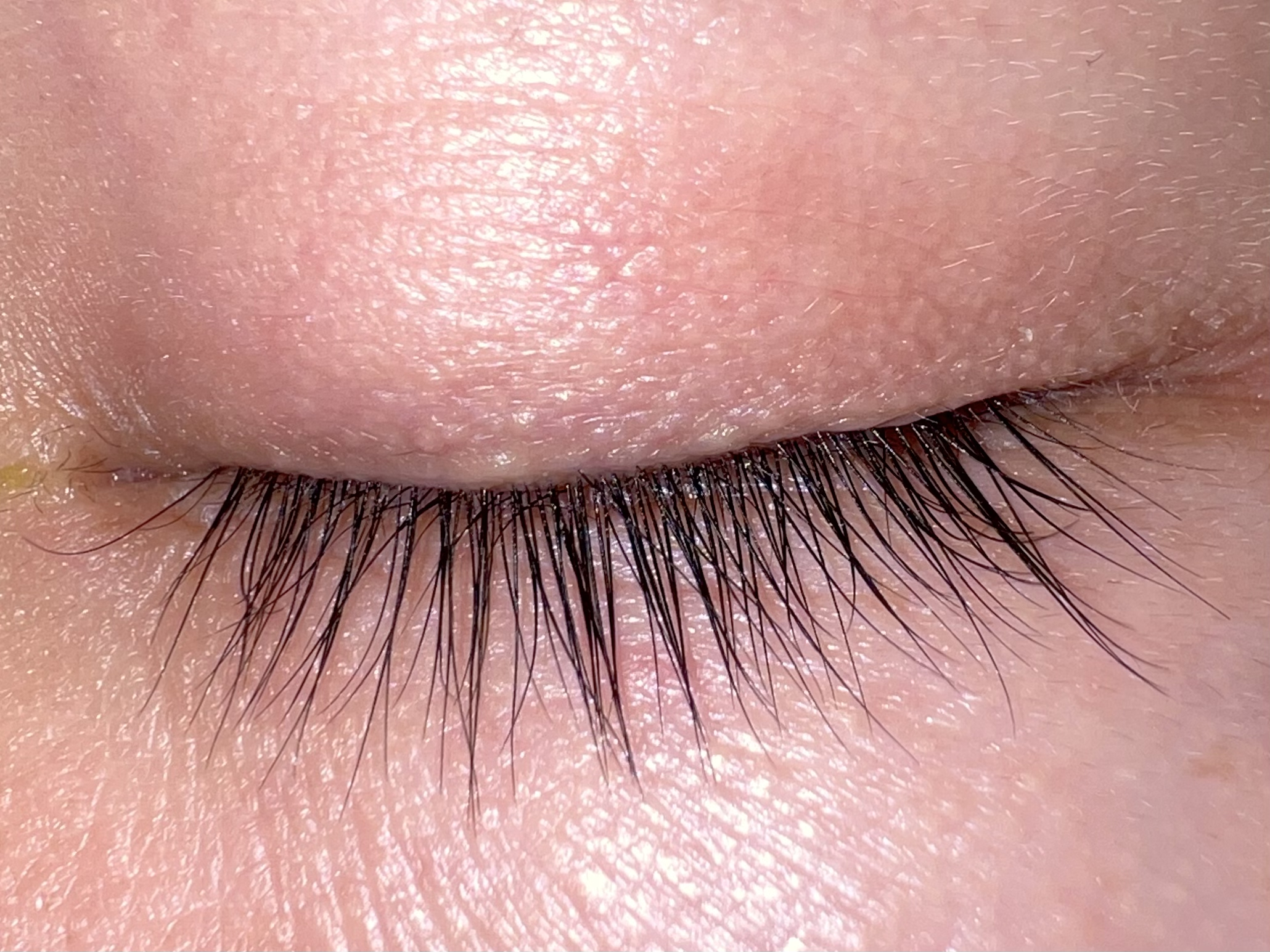
Eyelashes are hairs on the edges of the eyelids that catch dust and dirt when the eye is blinked.

==== Eyebrows and eyelashes ====
The eyebrows provide moderate protection to the eyes from dirt, sweat and rain. They also play a key role in non-verbal communication by displaying emotions such as sadness, anger, surprise and excitement. In many other mammals, they contain much longer, whisker-like hairs that act as tactile sensors.

The eyelash grows at the edges of the eyelid and protects the eye from dirt. The eyelash is to humans, camels, horses, ostriches etc., what whiskers are to cats; they are used to sense when dirt, dust, or any other potentially harmful object is too close to the eye. The eye reflexively closes as a result of this sensation.

Eyebrows and eyelashes do not grow beyond a certain length (eyelashes are rarely more than 10 mm long). However, trichomegaly can cause the lashes to grow remarkably long and prominent (in some cases the upper lashes grow to 15 mm long).

== Evolution ==
Hair has its origins in the common ancestor of mammals, the synapsids, about 300 million years ago. It is currently unknown at what stage the synapsids acquired mammalian characteristics such as body hair and mammary glands, as the fossils only rarely provide direct evidence for soft tissues. Skin impression of the belly and lower tail of a pelycosaur, possibly Haptodus shows the basal synapsid stock bore transverse rows of rectangular scutes, similar to those of a modern crocodile, so the age of acquirement of hair logically could not have been earlier than ≈299 ma, based on the current understanding of the animal's phylogeny. An exceptionally well-preserved skull of Estemmenosuchus, a therapsid from the Upper Permian, shows smooth, hairless skin with what appears to be glandular depressions, though as a semi-aquatic species it might not have been particularly useful to determine the integument of terrestrial species. The oldest undisputed known fossils showing unambiguous imprints of hair are the Callovian (late middle Jurassic) Castorocauda and several contemporary haramiyidans, both near-mammal cynodonts, giving the age as no later than ≈220 ma based on the modern phylogenetic understanding of these clades. More recently, studies on terminal Permian Russian coprolites may suggest that non-mammalian synapsids from that era had fur. If this is the case, these are the oldest hair remnants known, showcasing that fur occurred as far back as the latest Paleozoic.

Some modern mammals have a special gland in front of each orbit used to preen the fur, called the harderian gland. Imprints of this structure are found in the skull of the small early mammals like Morganucodon, but not in their cynodont ancestors like Thrinaxodon.

The hairs of the fur in modern animals are all connected to nerves, and so the fur also serves as a transmitter for sensory input. Fur could have evolved from sensory hair (whiskers). The signals from this sensory apparatus is interpreted in the neocortex, a section of the brain that expanded markedly in animals like Morganucodon and Hadrocodium. The more advanced therapsids could have had a combination of naked skin, whiskers, and scutes. A full pelage likely did not evolve until the therapsid-mammal transition. The more advanced, smaller therapsids could have had a combination of hair and scutes, a combination still found in some modern mammals, such as rodents and the opossum.

The high interspecific variability of the size, color, and microstructure of hair often enables the identification of species based on single hair filaments.

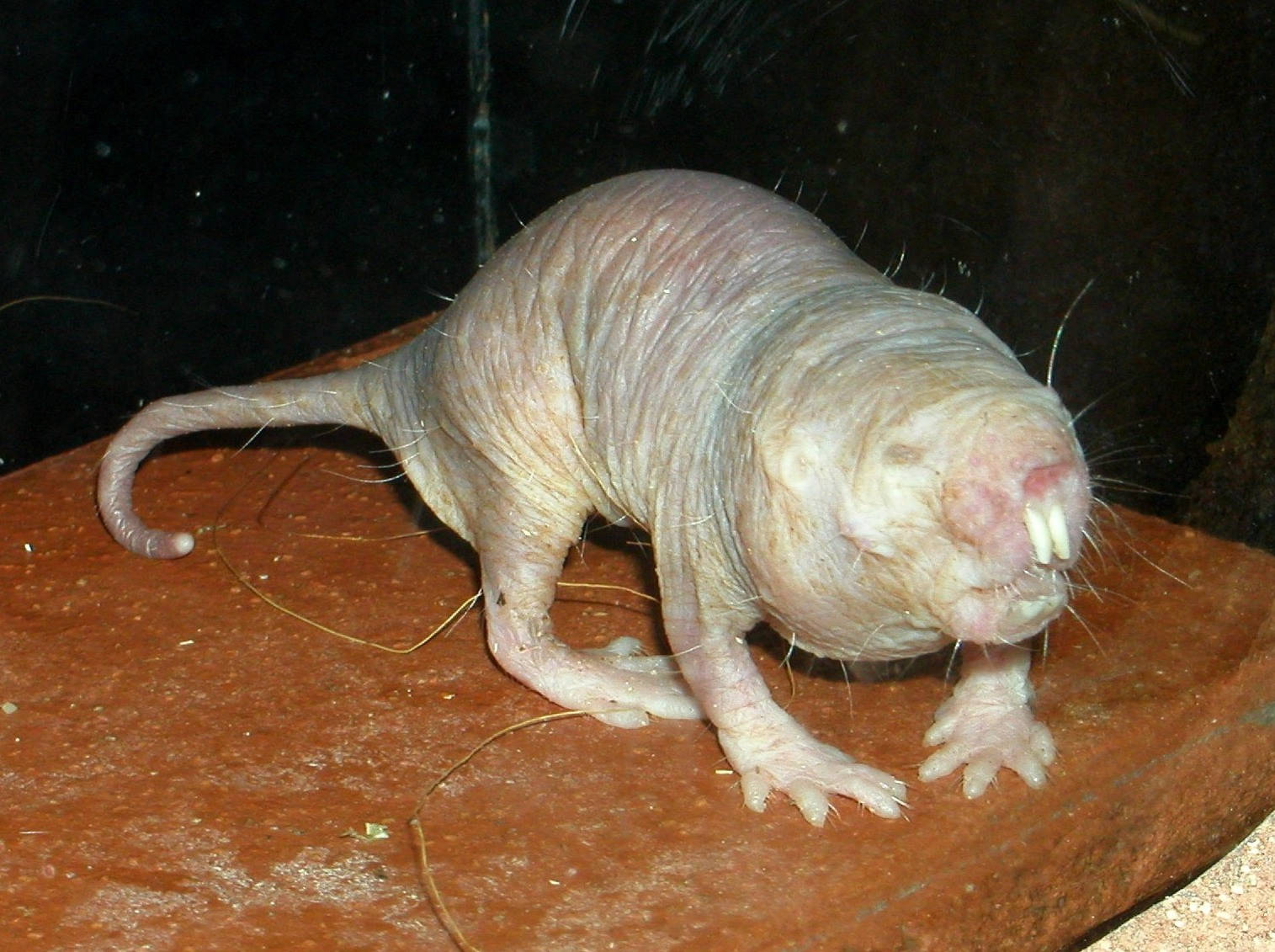
Naked mole-rat (Heterocephalus glaber) in a zoo.

In varying degrees most mammals have some skin areas without natural hair. On the human body, glabrous skin is found on the ventral portion of the fingers, palms, soles of feet and lips, which are all parts of the body most closely associated with interacting with the world around us, as are the labia minora and glans penis. There are four main types of mechanoreceptors in the glabrous skin of humans: Pacinian corpuscles, Meissner's corpuscles, Merkel's discs, and Ruffini corpuscles.

The naked mole-rat (Heterocephalus glaber) has evolved skin lacking in general, pelagic hair covering, yet has retained long, very sparsely scattered tactile hairs over its body. Glabrousness is a trait that may be associated with neoteny.

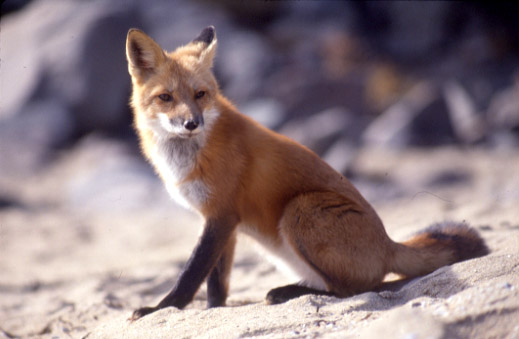
The soft, fine hair found on many nonhuman mammals is typically called fur.

=== Evolutionary variation ===
Primates are relatively hairless compared to other mammals, and Hominini such as chimpanzees, have less dense hair than would be expected given their body size for a primate. Evolutionary biologists suggest that the genus Homo arose in East Africa approximately 2 million years ago. Part of this evolution was the development of endurance running and venturing out during the hot times of the day that required efficient thermoregulation through perspiration. The loss of heat through heat of evaporation by means of sweat glands is aided by air currents next to the skin surface, which are facilitated by the loss of body hair.

Another factor in human evolution that also occurred in the prehistoric past was a preferential selection for neoteny, particularly in females. The idea that adult humans exhibit certain neotenous (juvenile) features, not evinced in the other great apes, is about a century old. Louis Bolk made a long list of such traits, and Stephen Jay Gould published a short list in Ontogeny and Phylogeny. In addition, paedomorphic characteristics in women are often acknowledged as desirable by men in developed countries. For instance, vellus hair is a juvenile characteristic. However, while men develop longer, coarser, thicker, and darker terminal hair through sexual differentiation, women do not, leaving their vellus hair visible.

=== Texture ===
==== Curly hair ====
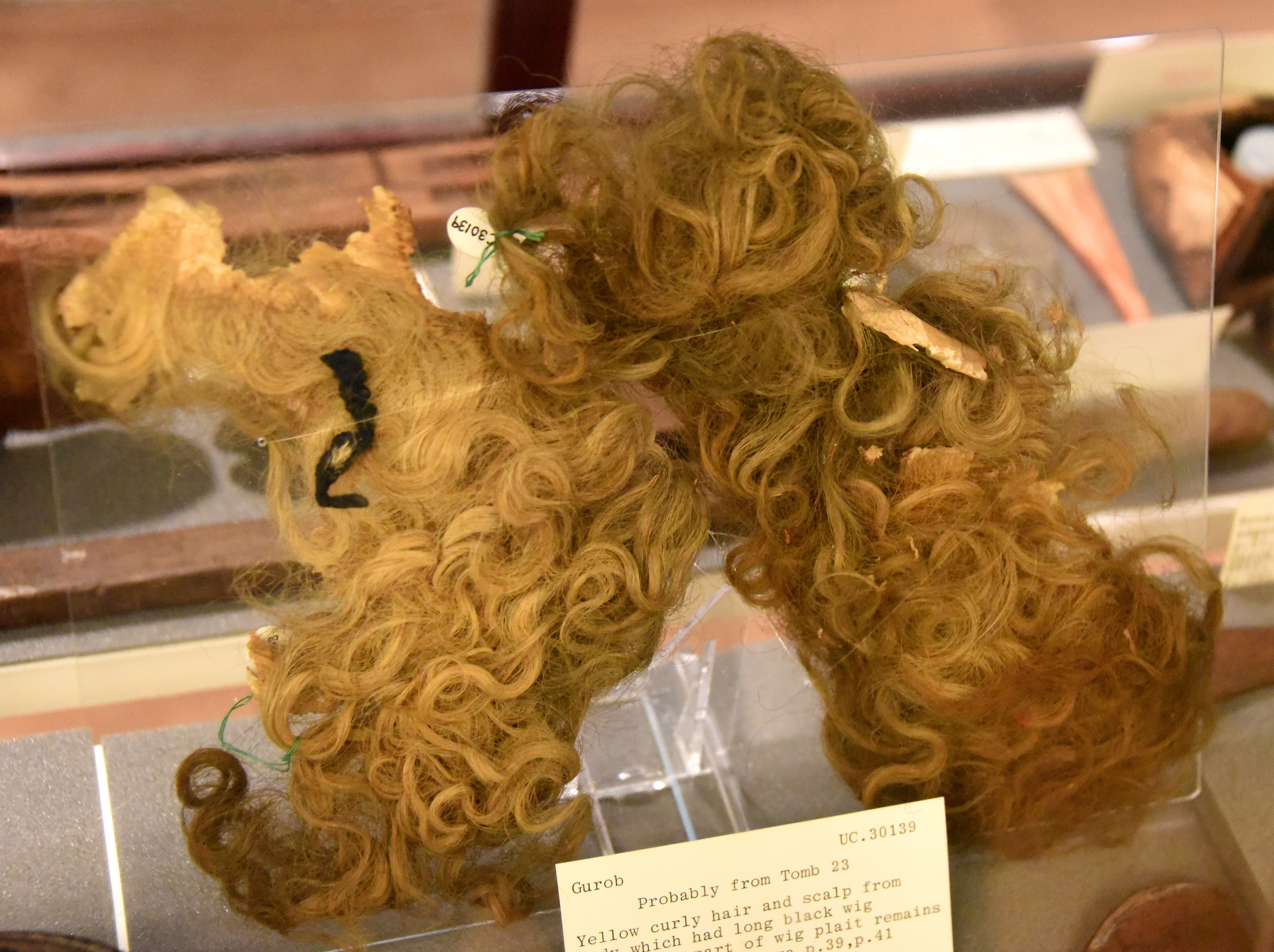
Yellow curly hair and scalp from body which had long black wig over hair. Parts of wig plait remains. From Egypt, Gurob, probably tomb 23. 18th–19th Dynasty. The Petrie Museum of Egyptian Archaeology, London

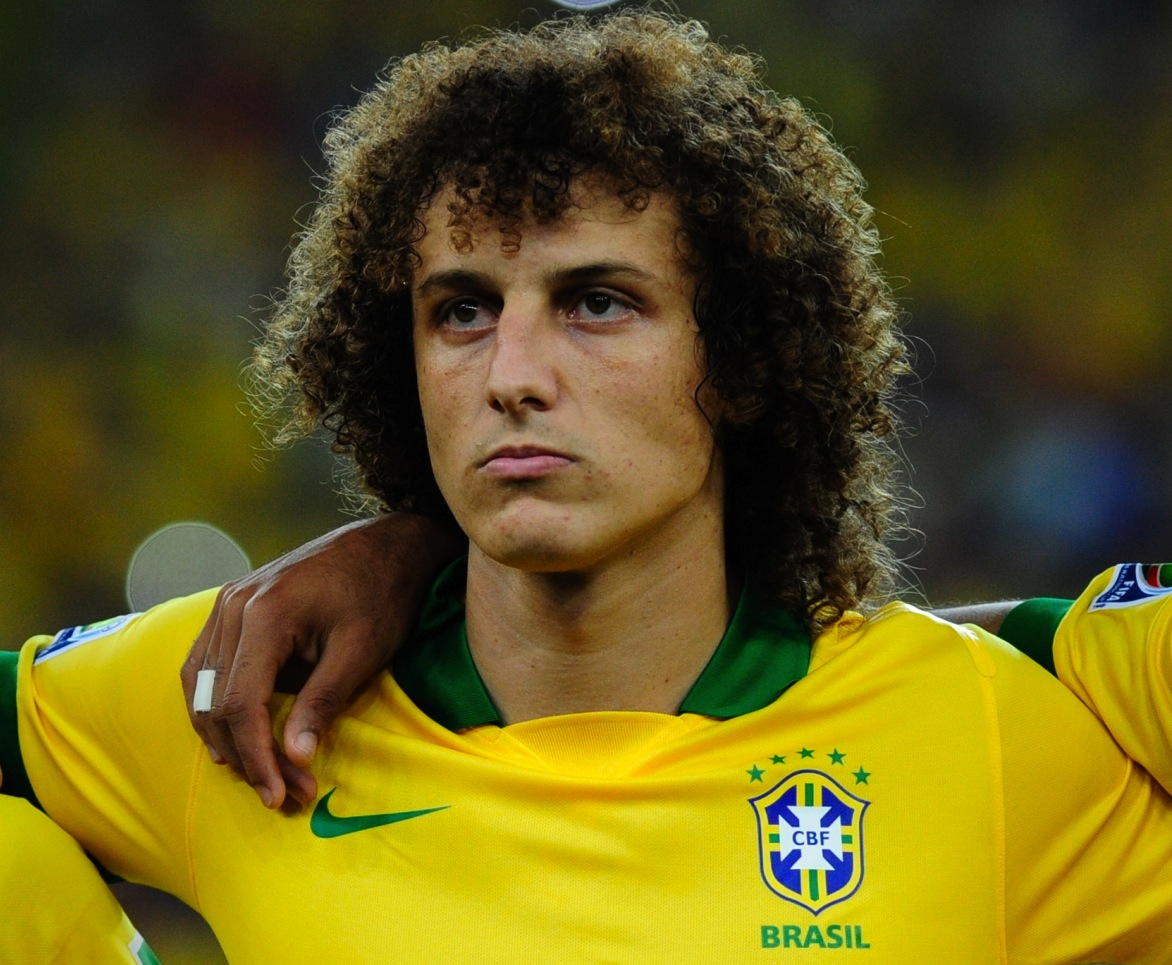
Man with curly hair (David Luiz, Brazilian footballer)

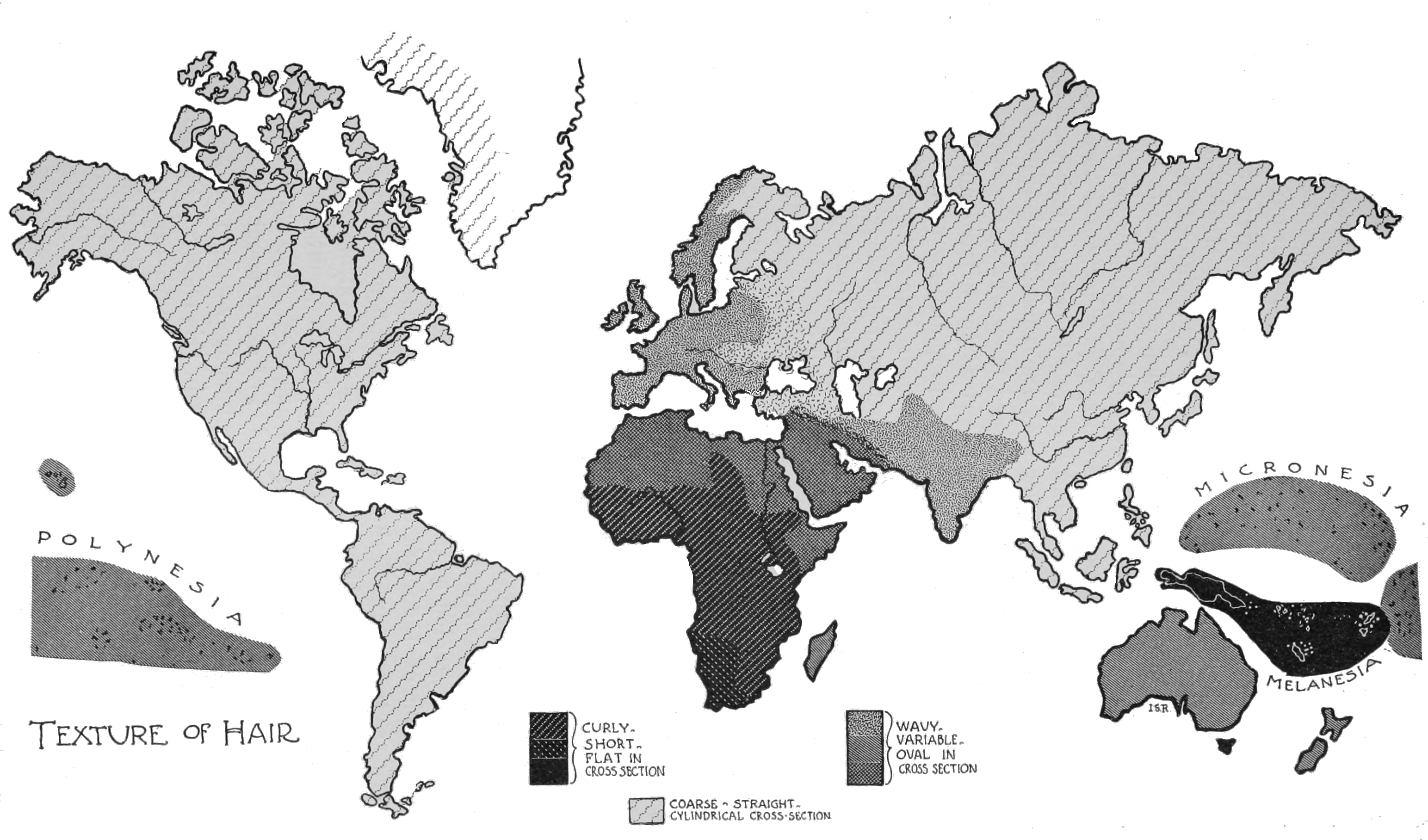
Global hair texture map

Jablonski asserts head hair was evolutionarily advantageous for pre-humans to retain because it protected the scalp as they walked upright in the intense African (equatorial) UV light. While some might argue that, by this logic, humans should also express hairy shoulders because these body parts would putatively be exposed to similar conditions, the protection of the head, the seat of the brain that enabled humanity to become one of the most successful species on the planet (and which also is very vulnerable at birth) was arguably a more urgent issue (axillary hair in the underarms and groin were also retained as signs of sexual maturity). Sometime during the gradual process by which Homo erectus began a transition from furry skin to the naked skin expressed by Homo sapiens, hair texture putatively gradually changed from straight hair (the condition of most mammals, including humanity's closest cousins—chimpanzees) to Afro-textured hair or 'kinky' (i.e. tightly coiled). This argument assumes that curly hair better impedes the passage of UV light into the body relative to straight hair (thus curly or coiled hair would be particularly advantageous for light-skinned hominids living at the equator).

It is substantiated by Iyengar's findings (1998) that UV light can enter into straight human hair roots (and thus into the body through the skin) via the hair shaft. Specifically, the results of that study suggest that this phenomenon resembles the passage of light through fiber optic tubes (which do not function as effectively when kinked or sharply curved or coiled). In this sense, when hominids (i.e. Homo erectus) were gradually losing their straight body hair and thereby exposing the initially pale skin underneath their fur to the sun, straight hair would have been an adaptive liability. By inverse logic, later, as humans traveled farther from Africa and/or the equator, straight hair may have (initially) evolved to aid the entry of UV light into the body during the transition from dark, UV-protected skin to paler skin.

Jablonski's assertions suggest that the adjective "woolly" in reference to Afro-hair is a misnomer in connoting the high heat insulation derivable from the true wool of sheep. Instead, the relatively sparse density of Afro-hair, combined with its springy coils actually results in an airy, almost sponge-like structure that in turn, Jablonski argues, more likely facilitates an increase in the circulation of cool air onto the scalp. Further, wet Afro-hair does not stick to the neck and scalp unless totally drenched and instead tends to retain its basic springy puffiness because it less easily responds to moisture and sweat than straight hair does. In this sense, the trait may enhance comfort levels in intense equatorial climates more than straight hair (which, on the other hand, tends to naturally fall over the ears and neck to a degree that provides slightly enhanced comfort levels in cold climates relative to tightly coiled hair).

Further, it is notable that the most pervasive expression of this hair texture can be found in sub-Saharan Africa; a region of the world that abundant genetic and paleo-anthropological evidence suggests, was the relatively recent (≈200,000-year-old) point of origin for modern humanity. In fact, although genetic findings (Tishkoff, 2009) suggest that sub-Saharan Africans are the most genetically diverse continental group on Earth, Afro-textured hair approaches ubiquity in this region. This points to a strong, long-term selective pressure that, in stark contrast to most other regions of the genomes of sub-Saharan groups, left little room for genetic variation at the determining loci. Such a pattern, again, does not seem to support human sexual aesthetics as being the sole or primary cause of this distribution.

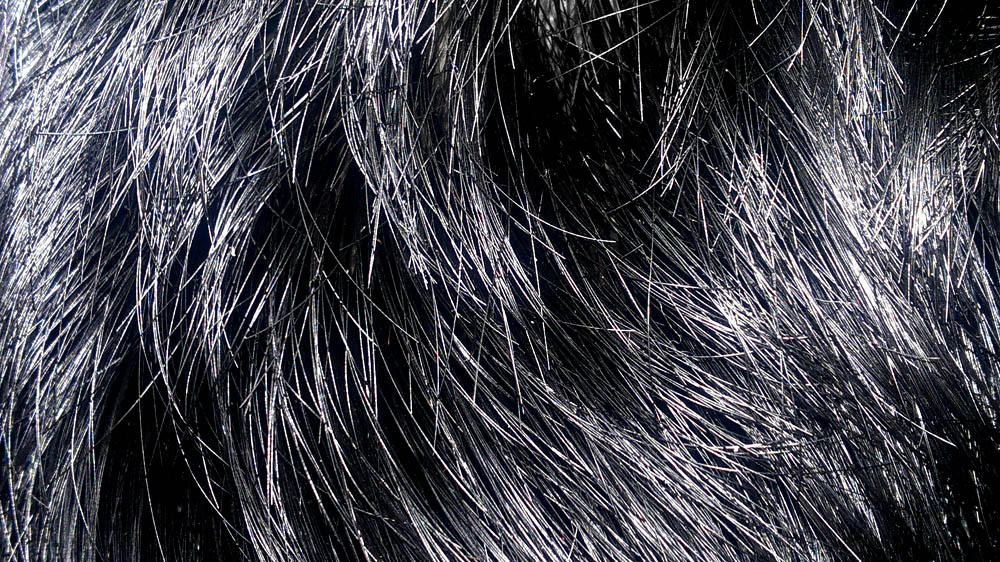
Straight black hair

==== The EDAR locus ====
A group of studies have recently shown that genetic patterns at the EDAR locus, a region of the modern human genome that contributes to hair texture variation among most individuals of East Asian descent, support the hypothesis that (East Asian) straight hair likely developed in this branch of the modern human lineage subsequent to the original expression of tightly coiled natural afro-hair. Specifically, the relevant findings indicate that the EDAR mutation coding for the predominant East Asian 'coarse' or thick, straight hair texture arose within the past ≈65,000 years, which is a time frame that covers from the earliest of the 'Out of Africa' migrations up to now.

== Disease ==
Ringworm is a fungal disease that targets hairy skin.

Premature greying of hair is another condition that results in greying before the age of 20 years in Europeans, before 25 years in Asians, and before 30 years in Africans.

== Hair care ==
Hair care involves the hygiene and cosmetology of hair including hair on the scalp, facial hair (beard and moustache), pubic hair and other body hair. Hair care routines differ according to an individual's culture and the physical characteristics of one's hair. Hair may be colored, trimmed, shaved, plucked, or otherwise removed with treatments such as waxing, sugaring, and threading.

=== Removal practices ===
Depilation is the removal of hair from the surface of the skin. This can be achieved through methods such as shaving. Epilation is the removal of the entire hair strand, including the part of the hair that has not yet left the follicle. A popular way to epilate hair is through waxing.

==== Shaving ====
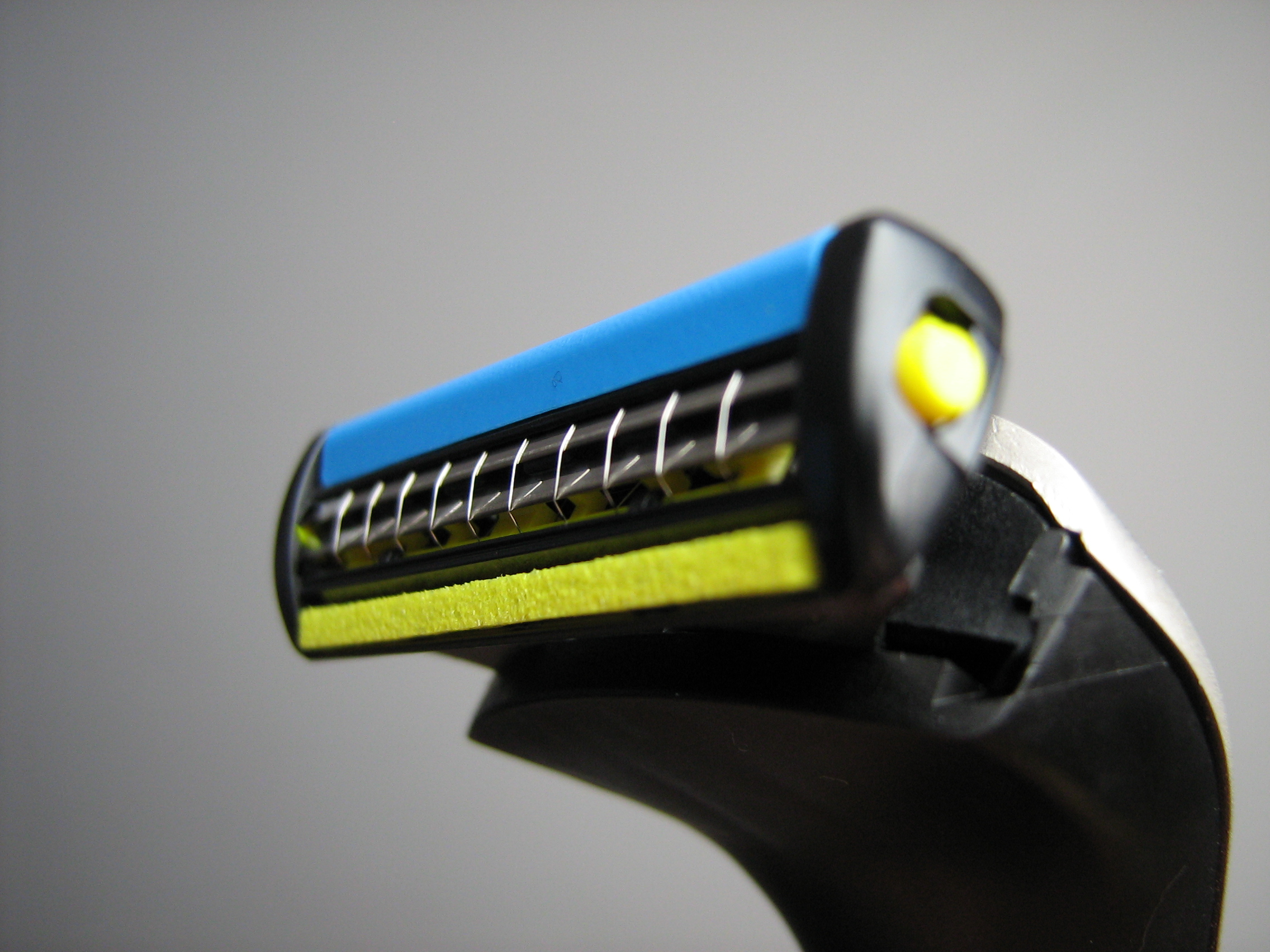
Many razors have multiple blades purportedly to ensure a close shave. While shaving initially will leave skin feeling smooth and hair free, new hair growth can appear a few hours after hair removal.

Shaving is accomplished with bladed instruments, such as razors. The blade is brought close to the skin and stroked over the hair in the desired area to cut the terminal hairs and leave the skin feeling smooth. Depending upon the rate of growth, one can begin to feel the hair growing back within hours of shaving. This is especially evident in men who develop a five o'clock shadow after having shaved their faces. This new growth is called stubble. Stubble typically appears to grow back thicker because the shaved hairs are blunted instead of tapered off at the end, although the hair never actually grows back thicker.

==== Waxing ====
Waxing involves using a sticky wax and strip of paper or cloth to pull hair from the root. Waxing is the ideal hair removal technique to keep an area hair-free for long periods of time. It can take three to five weeks for waxed hair to begin to resurface again. Hair in areas that have been waxed consistently is known to grow back finer and thinner, especially compared to hair that has been shaved with a razor.

==== Laser removal ====
Laser hair removal is a cosmetic method where a small laser beam pulses selective heat on dark target matter in the area that causes hair growth without harming the skin tissue. This process is repeated several times over the course of many months to a couple of years with hair regrowing less frequently until it finally stops; this is used as a more permanent solution to waxing or shaving. Laser removal is practiced in many clinics along with many at-home products.

==== Cutting and trimming ====
Because the hair on one's head is normally longer than other types of body hair, it is cut with scissors or clippers. People with longer hair will most often use scissors to cut their hair, whereas shorter hair is maintained using a trimmer. Depending on the desired length and overall health of the hair, periods without cutting or trimming the hair can vary.

Cut hair may be used in wigs. Global imports of hair in 2010 was worth $US 1.24 billion.

== Social role ==
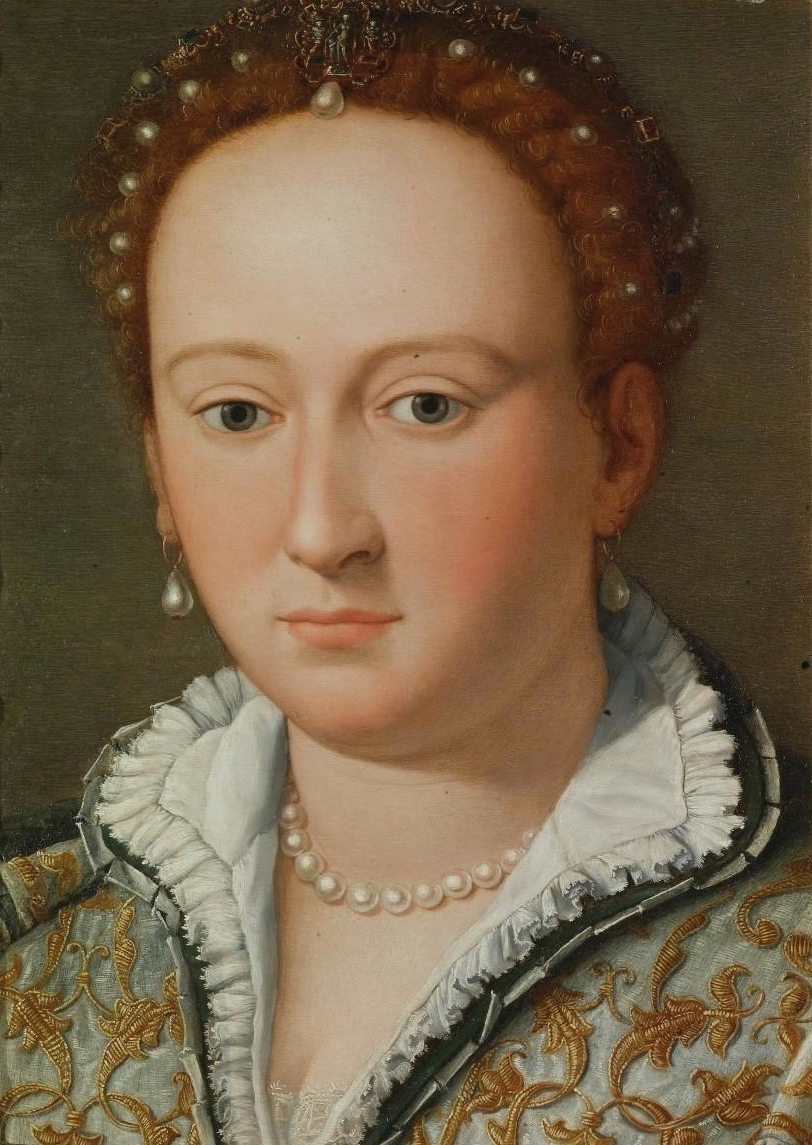
Portrait of a Woman by Alessandro Allori (1535–1607) at Uffizi Gallery. It shows a plucked hairline that gives a fashionably noble brow.

Hair has great social significance for human beings. It can grow on most external areas of the human body, except on the palms of the hands and the soles of the feet (among other areas). Hair is most noticeable on most people in a small number of areas, which are also the ones that are most commonly trimmed, plucked, or shaved. These include the face, ears, head, eyebrows, legs, and armpits, as well as the pubic region. The highly visible differences between male and female body and facial hair are a notable secondary sex characteristic.

The world's longest documented hair belongs to Xie Qiuping (in China), at 5.627 m (18 ft 5.5 in) when measured on 8 May 2004. She has been growing her hair since 1973, from the age of 13.

=== Indication of status ===
Healthy hair indicates health and youth (important in evolutionary biology). Hair color and texture can be a sign of ethnic ancestry. Facial hair is a sign of puberty in men. White or gray hair is a sign of age or genetics, which may be concealed with hair dye (not easily for some), although many prefer to assume it (especially if it is a poliosis characteristic of the person since childhood). Pattern baldness in men is usually seen as a sign of aging that may be concealed with a toupee, hats, or religious and cultural adornments; however, the condition can be triggered by various hormonal factors at any age following puberty and is not uncommon in younger men. Although pattern baldness can be slowed down by drugs such as Finasteride and Minoxidil or treated with hair transplants, many men see this as unnecessary effort for the sake of vanity and instead shave their heads. In early modern China, the queue was a male hairstyle in which the hair at the front and top was shaved every 10 days in a style mimicking pattern baldness, while the remaining hair at the back was braided into a long pigtail.

A hairstyle may be an indicator of group membership. During the English Civil War, followers of Oliver Cromwell cropped their hair close to their head in an act of defiance against the curls and ringlets of the king's men, which led to them being nicknamed Roundheads. Recent isotopic analysis of hair is helping to shed further light on sociocultural interaction, giving information on food procurement and consumption in the 19th century. Having bobbed hair was popular among the flappers in the 1920s as a sign of rebellion against traditional roles for women. Female art students known as the Cropheads also adopted the style, notably at the Slade School in London. Regional variations in hirsutism has caused practices regarding hair on the arms and legs to differ. Some religious groups may follow certain rules regarding hair as part of religious observance. The rules often differ for men and women.

Many subcultures have hairstyles which may indicate an unofficial membership. Many hippies, metalheads, and Indian sadhus have long hair, as well many older hipsters. Many punks wear a hairstyle known as a mohawk or other spiked and dyed hairstyles, while skinheads have short-cropped or completely shaved heads. Long stylized bangs were very common for emos, scene kids, and younger hipsters in the 2000s and early 2010s.

Heads were shaved in concentration camps, and head-shaving has been used as punishment, especially for women with long hair. The shaven head is common in military haircuts, while Western monks are known for the tonsure. By contrast, among some Indian holy men, the hair is worn extremely long.

In the time of Confucius (5th century BCE), the Chinese grew out their hair and often tied it, as a symbol of filial piety. Regular hairdressing in some cultures is considered a sign of wealth or status. The dreadlocks of the Rastafari movement were despised early in the movement's history. In some cultures, having one's hair cut can symbolize a liberation from one's past, usually after a trying time in one's life. Cutting the hair also may be a sign of mourning.

Tightly coiled hair in its natural state may be worn in an Afro. This hairstyle was once worn among African Americans as a symbol of racial pride. Given that the coiled texture is the natural state of some African Americans' hair, or perceived as being more "African", this simple style is now often seen as a sign of self-acceptance and an affirmation that the beauty norms of the (eurocentric) dominant culture are not absolute. African Americans as a whole have a variety of hair textures, as they are not an ethnically homogeneous group, but an ad-hoc of many diverse genetic backgrounds.

The film Easy Rider (1969) includes the assumption that the two main characters could have their long hairs forcibly shaved with a rusty razor when jailed, symbolizing the intolerance of some conservative groups toward members of the counterculture. At the conclusion of England's 1971 Oz trials, the defendants had their heads shaved by the police, causing public outcry. During the appeal trial, they appeared in the dock wearing wigs. A case where a 14-year-old student was expelled from school in Brazil in the mid-2000s, allegedly because of his fauxhawk haircut, sparked national debate and legal action resulting in compensation.

=== Religious practices ===
Women's hair may be hidden using headscarves, a common part of the hijab in Islam and a symbol of modesty required for certain religious rituals in Eastern Orthodoxy. The Russian Orthodox Church requires all married women to wear headscarves inside the church; this tradition is often extended to all women, regardless of marital status. Orthodox Judaism also commands the use of scarves and other head coverings for married women for modesty reasons. Certain Hindu sects also wear head scarves for religious reasons. Sikhs have an obligation not to cut hair (a Sikh cutting hair becomes 'apostate' which means fallen from religion) and men keep it tied in a bun on the head, which is then covered appropriately using a turban. Multiple religions, both ancient and contemporary, require or advise one to allow their hair to become dreadlocks, though people also wear them for fashion. For men, Islam, Orthodox Judaism, Orthodox Christianity, Roman Catholicism, and other religious groups have at various times recommended or required the covering of the head and sections of the hair of men, and some have dictates relating to the cutting of men's facial and head hair. Some Christian sects throughout history and up to modern times have also religiously proscribed the cutting of women's hair. For some Sunni madhabs, the donning of a kufi or topi is a form of sunnah. Brahmin males are prescribed to shave their heads, but leave a tuft of hair unshaved, worn in the form of a topknot.

=== In Arabic poetry ===
Since ancient times, women's long, thick, wavy hair has featured prominently in Arabic poetry. Pre-Islamic poets used only limited imagery to describe women's hair. For example, al-A'sha wrote a verse comparing a lover's hair to "a garden whose grapes dangle down upon me", but Bashshar ibn Burd considered this unusual. One comparison used by early poets, such as Imru al-Qays, was to bunches of dates. In Abbasid times, however, the imagery for hair expanded significantly - particularly for the then-fashionable "love-locks" (sudgh) framing the temples, which came into style at the court of the caliph al-Amin. Hair curls were compared to hooks and chains, letters (such as fa, waw, lam, and nun), scorpions, annelids, and polo sticks. An example was the poet Ibn al-Mu'tazz, who compared a lock of hair and a birthmark to a polo stick driving a ball.

== See also ==
- Body hair
- Bristle sensilla, tactile hairs in insects
- Chaetophobia, the fear of hair
- Hair analysis (alternative medicine)
- Hypertrichosis, the state of having an excess of hair on the head or body
- Hypotrichosis, the state of having a less than normal amount of hair on the head or body
- Lanugo
- List of hairstyles
- Mane (horse)
- Prehistory of nakedness and clothing, how humans lost most of their body hair
- Seta, hair-like structures in insects
- Trichology, the study of the hair and scalp
- Trichotillomania, hair pulling
