= Xie Qiuping =

Chinese world record holder (born c. 1960)

Xie Qiuping (Chinese: 謝秋萍, born c. 1960) is a Chinese citizen who holds the record for world's longest hair. On 8 May 2004, her hair was measured to be 5.627 meters (18 ft 5.54 in). She began growing her hair to its current length in 1973 at the age of 13. She is the Guinness World Record holder for 2018.
