= Transverse muscle =

Transverse muscle may refer to:

- Transverse abdominal muscle
- Transverse muscle of tongue
- Transverse muscle of the chin, a facial muscle
- Transverse perineal muscles
  - Deep transverse perineal muscle
  - Superficial transverse perineal muscle
