= David Douglas Cunningham =

Scottish doctor and researcher

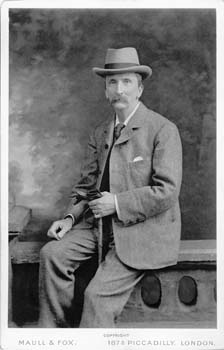
Carte de visite of David Douglas Cunningham FRS, photo by Maull & Fox

David Douglas Cunningham CIE FRS FZS FLS (29 September 1843 – 31 December 1914) was a Scottish medical doctor and researcher who worked extensively in India on various aspects of public health and medicine. He studied the spread of bacteria and the spores of fungi through the air and conducted research on cholera. In his spare time he also studied the local plants and animals.

== Life and career ==
Cunningham was born in 1843, in Prestonpans, the third son of Cecilia Margaret Douglas (1813–98), daughter of David Douglas, Lord Reston (1769–1819), the heir of Adam Smith, and her husband the Rev. William Bruce Cunningham (1806–78). He attended the Royal College of Physicians of Edinburgh, and graduated with honours in medicine from the University of Edinburgh in 1867. His brother Robert Oliver Cunningham also became a surgeon and zoologist. He entered the Indian Medical Service in 1868, and was selected to conduct a special enquiry into cholera by the Secretaries of State for India and for War. He studied for a time in Munich, and arrived in Calcutta in January 1869 along with another physician Timothy Richards Lewis (1841–1886). From 1874 he was appointed as a special assistant to the sanitary commissioner of India. In June 1879 he was appointed Professor of Physiology in the Medical College, Calcutta, where he was much engaged in the investigation of cholera. There were multiple competing theories on the nature of diseases in general and cholera in particular. There was a "miasma" theory that certain locations had bad air that led to disease and there was a "contagion" theory that particles of causal agents entered the body to cause disease and could be carried by a person. In addition there were questions on whether the two theories may both hold and that cholera was caused by a fungus-like organism that produced spores that would be distributed in the air. Cunningham examined many of these theories in India. He was appointed Surgeon Major of the Bengal Medical Service by 1888 and Honorary Surgeon to the Viceroy of India. He was selected as the Naturalist for the Tibet Mission of 1886.

== Scientific contributions ==
Cunningham made pioneering studies in aerobiology. He made use of the aeroconiscope, a device with a vane that pointed a sampling cone towards the wind with a sticky slide placed behind a funnel. The sticky slide would then be examined for aerially dispersed biota. His studies on the microbes, spores and pollen in the air of Calcutta were published in 1873. Cunningham's other major and official work was in studying the nature of spread of cholera. Their official work however did not progress and the project was terminated and in 1879, Cunningham took up an academic position as Professor of Physiology at the Calcutta Medical College. He was also able to pursue his interests in botany being temporarily appointed in 1880 as a superintendent of the Calcutta Royal Botanic Garden as George King, the regular superintendent, was put in charge of the cinchona plantation in the Mungpoo Hills, Darjeeling District. In 1883, Robert Koch visited India as part of a German cholera research committee and was able to isolate the comma bacteria Vibrio cholerae from the autopsy of a cholera victim. This led to the British government being forced to investigate the matter. A committee made up of two leading pathologists, Heneage Gibbes and Emanuel Klein, was set up and they visited Calcutta in November 1884. Cunningham worked with Klein, helping obtain samples from the same water storage which Koch had declared as being the source of the contagion affecting victims. Klein was able to examine and confirm that the bacteria in the water were similar to those in the bacteria in the stools of cholera victims but he was not sure about whether it caused cholera. The results of Koch however were enough for European governments to declare a quarantine on ship-borne visitors from India. The ensuing debate on the financial losses that would be caused led to the British government's decision to increase spending on research facilities and in December 1884, the Sanitary Commissioner was granted 15,000 rupees to set up a laboratory with Cunningham being made the director. In 1887-88 Cunningham accompanied the Sikkim Expedition as Government naturalist. Cunningham was a member of the council of the Calcutta zoological garden and in 1898, a bronze medallion of him was gifted to the zoological garden. In 1876 he was elected Fellow of the Linnean Society and in June 1889 Fellow of the Royal Society. In June 1893 he was made a Companion of the Order of the Indian Empire.

Cunningham published many of his notes in the Scientific Memoirs by medical officers of the Army of India. Including a species of fungi (Rhamphospora nymphaeae) found on the leaves of waterlilies; Nymphaea stellata, Nymphaea lotus and Nymphaea rubra. A species of Gymnosporangium fungus, G. cunninghamianum was named after him by Major A. Barclay in 1890, who found it in Simla but received illustrations matching them made by Cunningham from Almora in 1874. Cunningham also took a great interest in the mode of action of snake venom. He was interested in the fertilization mechanism in Ficus, the gases released by Ottelia and a range of other topics. He was interested in the philosophy of Kant and Hegel. He could speak Punjabi, knew the scriptures of the Sikhs and in his youth was a wrestler in the Sikh tradition.

Cunningham retired due to ill-health in 1898. He was appointed Honorary Physician to George V. He was unmarried, and died on 31 December 1914 at his home in Torre Mount, Torquay.

== Publications ==
- Cunningham, D.D. 1873. Microscopic examination of air. Govt. of India Publication, Calcutta.
- Some Indian Friends and Acquaintances: A Study of the Ways of Birds and other Animals Frequenting India (John Murray, 1903)
- Plagues and pleasures of life in Bengal (John Murray, 1907).
- Cunningham, D. D. (1879). "On the Occurrence of Conidial Fructification in the Mucorini, illustrated by Choanephora". Transactions of the Linnean Society of London. 1 (6): 409–422. doi:10.1111/j.1095-8339.1879.tb00141.x.
- Cunningham, D.D. (1879). "On Mycoidea parasitica, a new Genus of Parasitic Algae, and the Part which it plays in the Formation of certain Lichens". Transactions of the Linnean Society of London. 1 (6): 301–316. doi:10.1111/j.1095-8339.1879.tb00138.x.
- Cunningham, D.D. (1881). "On the development of certain microscopic organisms occurring in the intestinal canal" (PDF). Quarterly Journal of Microscopical Science. 82: 234–290.
- Cunningham, D.D. 1884 On the relation of Cholera to Schizomycete organisms Scientific memoirs by medical officers of the Army of India. Part 1.
- Cunningham, D.D. 1884 On the presence of peculiar parasitic organisms in the tissue of a specimen of Delhi Boil. Scientific memoirs by medical officers of the Army of India. Part 1.
