= Timothy Richards Lewis =

Welsh surgeon and pathologist

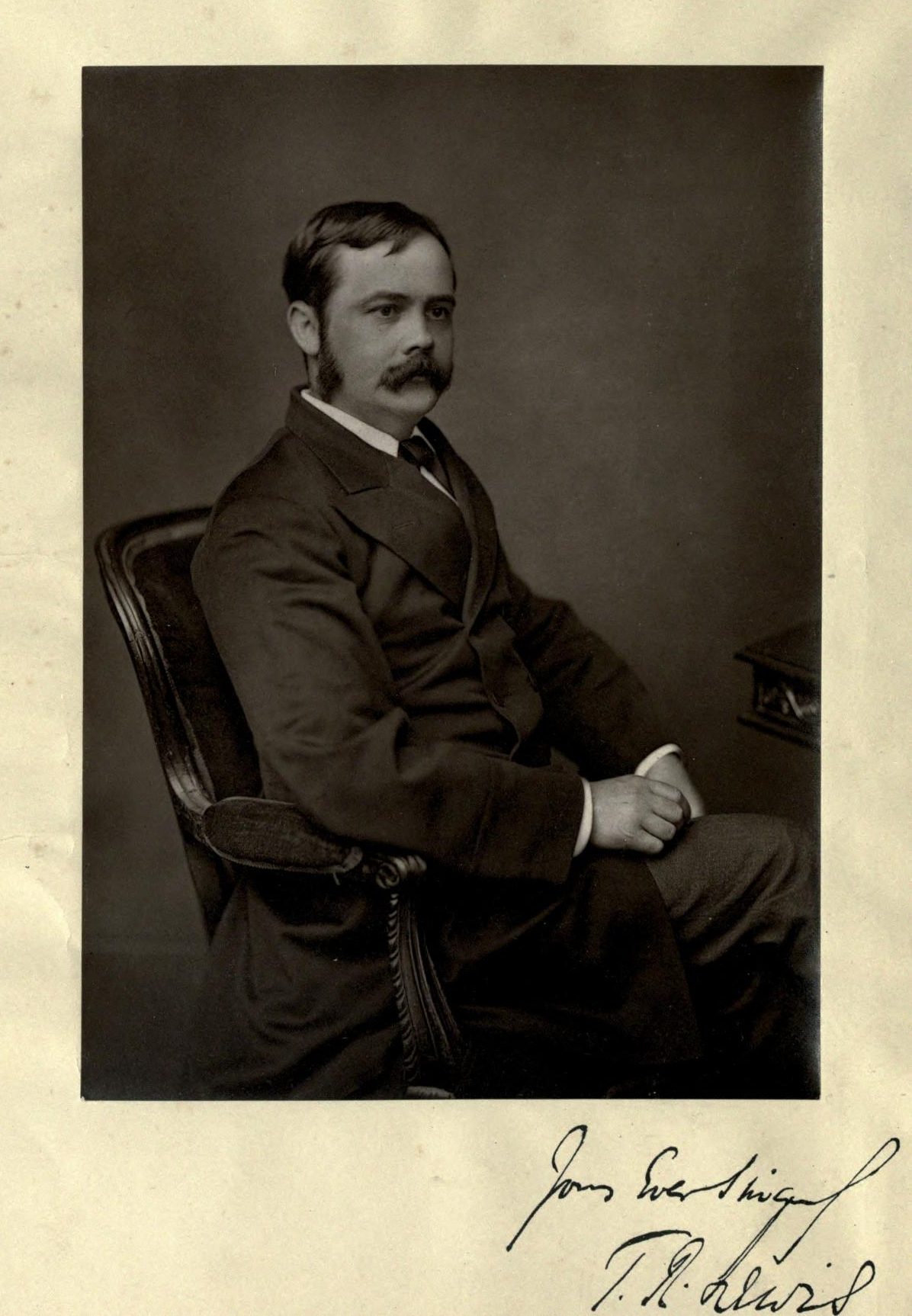
- Born: 31 October 1841; Llanboidy, Carmarthenshire, Wales
- Died: 7 May 1886 (aged 44)
- Education: University College London, Aberdeen University
- Occupation(s): surgeon and pathologist
- Known for: worked in India re: tropical medicine
- Notable work: role of nematode worms in filariasis

Timothy Richards Lewis (31 October 1841 – 7 May 1886) was a Welsh surgeon and pathologist who worked in India on several aspects of tropical medicine. He worked during the early period when the role of pathogenic organisms in disease were beginning to triumph over the older miasma theory. He was one of the first to identify the role of nematode worms in filariasis. His studies include those on cholera, leprosy, trypanosoma, and fungal infections.

Lewis is one of 23 researchers whose names are included in a frieze at the entrance of the London School of Hygiene and Tropical Medicine.

== Life ==
He was born at Llanboidy, Carmarthenshire to William Lewis and Britania née Richards and he grew up on the family farm at Pembrokeshire. After studying at Narberth National School the grammar school run by Joseph and William Edward Morris he apprenticed to a Narberth chemist. He moved to London when he was nineteen and worked as a chemist in Streatham and later at the German Hospital where he picked up the German language. He also attended lectures at the University College London, received a Fellowes silver medal in 1866 and qualified from Aberdeen University in 1867.

In 1868 Lewis joined the army service at Netley Hospital and rose to the position of a surgeon-major. He worked for three months at Munich with Max von Pettenkofer and then was posted to Calcutta in 1869. In Calcutta he worked with David Douglas Cunningham. In 1883 he returned to England and worked as a Professor of Pathology at Netley. In 1885 he served as honorary secretary of a committee to study Koch's discovery of cholera. Lewis and his committee members (Heneage Gibbes and Emanuel Klein) submitted an official refutation of Koch's study which may have involved not just science but the position of government officials (such as Sir Joseph Fayrer and J.M. Cuningham), several of whom opposed the contagion theory which would lead the implementation of quarantine regulations that would come greatly in the way of trade and movement. He died on 7 May 1886 of pneumonia, suspected to have been contracted in a laboratory accident.

== Works ==
Pettenkofer had suggested that soil conditions helped in cholera outbreaks while Ernst Hallier of Jena had suggested that it was caused by a fungus. Lewis tried to examine these hypotheses making studies of meteorological conditions and examining the stools of infected patients. A study with Cunningham was made on fungal skin infections.

While making studies of chyluria, Lewis noticed worms in the urine of a patient which was later found to be filaria and were independently discovered and described by Joseph Bancroft.

Lewis examined microscopic organisms in the blood of birds and mammals, and named several species of microbes including a trypanosome, Trypanosoma lewisi, from a rat.

== Family ==
Lewis married Emily Frances née Brown on 8 October 1879.

== Publications ==
- (1888) Physiological and pathological researches; being a reprint of the principal scientific writings of the late T. R. Lewis. In memoriam. Arranged and ed. by Sir William Aitken, G. E. Dobson, and A. E. Brown
- Lewis, T.R. and D.D. Cunningham (1877) Leprosy in India
- Lewis, T.R. and D.D. Cunningham (1877) The 'Oriental Sore,' as observed in India.
- Lewis, T.R. and D.D. Cunningham (1875) The soil in its relationto disease. A report of observations.
- Lewis, T.R. (1874) The pathological significance of nematode haematozoa. Calcutta: Government Press.
- Lewis, T.R. and D.D. Cunningham (1874) A report of microscopical and physiological researches into the nature of the agent or agents producing cholera.
- Lewis, T.R. (1870) A report on the microscopic objects found in Cholera evacuations, &c.
