= Brown Animal Sanatory Institution =

English research institute

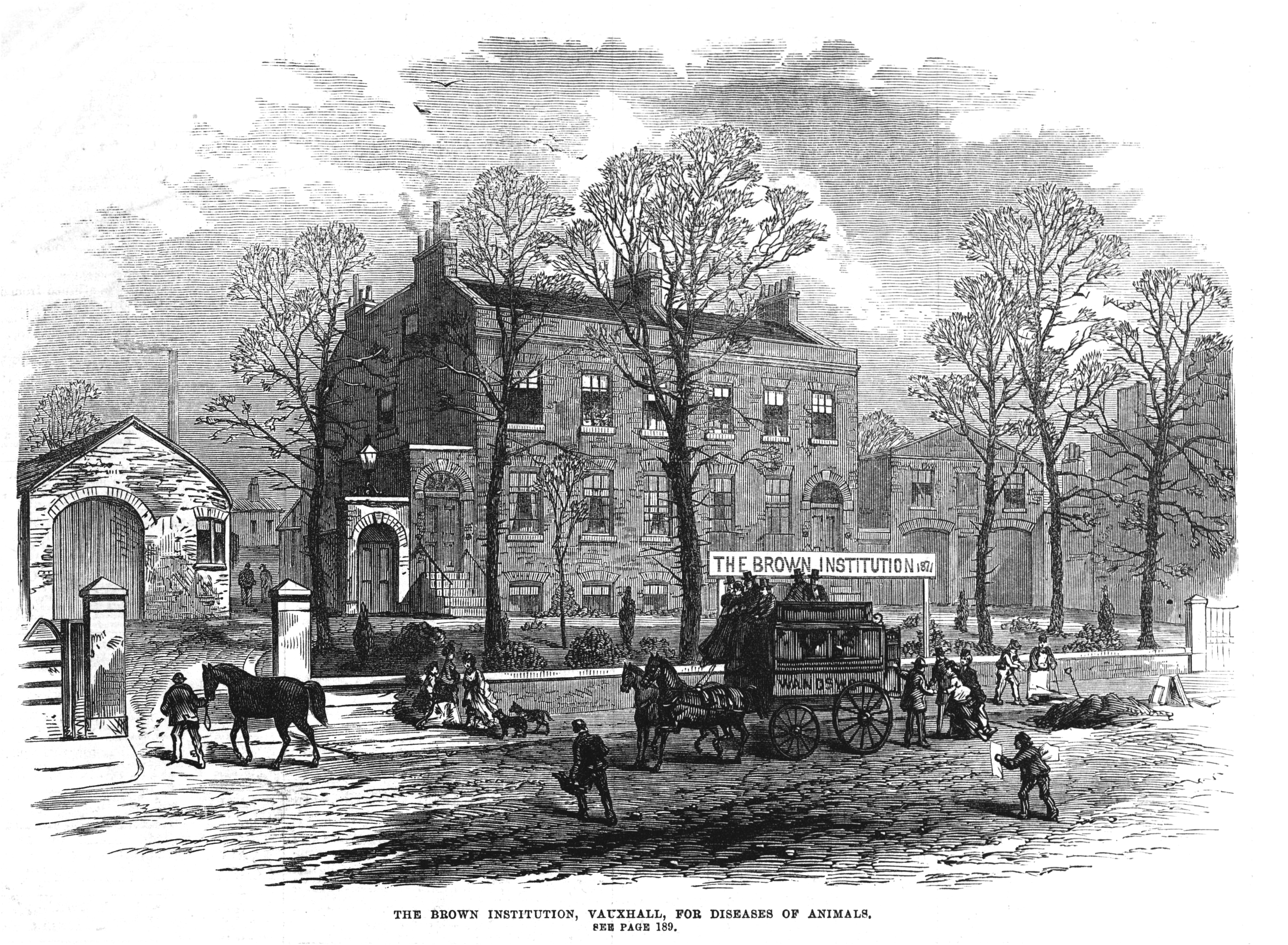
The Brown Institution in 1872

The Brown Animal Sanatory Institution sometimes referred to as the Brown Institution was an institute for veterinary research laboratory founded in 1871 in London, England. It was established from a sum of £20,000 left by Thomas Brown in his will. It was intended to be a centre for veterinary research and its early work was mainly in disease and physiology. It also served as a veterinary hospital. Seven out of its eight directors became Fellows of the Royal Society. In the late 1870s, the institute became a target of the anti-vivisection movement in England and the building on Wandsworth road was destroyed by German bombs in 1944.

== History ==
Mr Thomas Brown of Rosey Park Hill, Dublin who lived in London died in 1852. Brown's Will stated the purpose of his bequest for "founding, establishing and upholding an Institution for investigating, studying and, without charge beyond immediate expenses, endeavouring to cure maladies, distempers and injuries any quadrupeds or birds useful to man may be subject to, for and towards which purpose of founding, establishing and upholding such animal sanatory institution within a mile of either Westminster, Southwark or Dublin.” The funds were transferred to the University of London in 1858 and accumulated interest till 1871 to a value of £33,781. John Burdon-Sanderson was appointed as superintendent and because the Mortmain Act prevented purchase of land using the trust fund, a site of 1.5 acres was purchased with a £2,000 gift from John Cunliffe of Lombard Street and £500 from Burdon-Sanderson. The land was on Wandsworth Road. The institute was opened in 1871. The single large building had one basement floor accessible by a trapdoor from the apparatus room. A description by William Bulloch in 1925 notes:

"If one takes a tram from Westminster Bridge along the Embankment past “Lambeth Palace and Doultons and underneath an ugly railway bridge across the Wandsworth Road one reaches (No. 149) a small archway on which is graven the legend “The Brown Sanatory Institution founded 1871.” On entering, one comes to a stable yard and, behind, a low building of one storey. This is the famous “Brown” now falling, sad to say, into a considerable state of decay and uncared for."

The institute was supported by John Simon (1816-1904) pathologist and medical officer in the board of health for London. Among the researchers who worked at the institute was a Viennese scientist, Emanuel Edward Klein, sometimes considered the father of British bacteriology. The research he and his colleagues conducted at the Institution were published as in 1873 as the Handbook for the Physiological Laboratory along with John Burdon-Sanderson, Michael Foster, and Thomas Lauder Brunton. Their experiments included vivisection of animals, and following widespread protests, led to an enquiry in 1875, the Royal Commission on Vivisection for Scientific Purposes, chaired by Lord Cardwell and which resulted in the establishment of the Cruelty to Animals Act 1876. Activists writing in the press pointed out that a founding principle, "kindness to animals is a general principle of the Institution" was hardly followed.

The Superintendents of the Brown Institution were:

- Burdon-Sanderson (1871-1878)
- W. S. Greenfield (1878-1881)
- C. S. Roy (1881 - 1884)
- Victor Horsley (1884 - 1891)
- C. S. Sherrington (1891-1895)
- J. Rose Bradford (1895-1903)
- T. G. Brodie (1903-1909)
- F. W. Twort (1909- ?)

Among the other researchers who worked there were Charles Creighton, L. C. Wooldridge, W. G. Spencer, Charles Ballance, Arthur Edmunds, George Makins, A. E. Wright, Charles Plimmer and E. Mellanby.

The institution also served as a veterinary hospital with nearly 4000 cases being seen in its first two decades and 8000 in the second twenty years. The hospital was closed in 1939 but even before that it went into a steady decline with only about 1000 cases a year. The decline was due in part to a ban on pets in flats in the neighbourhood and the rise of motorized transport which led to a decline in horses. The first veterinary assistant was William Duguid. The rise of the Lister Institute is thought to have aided the decline of the Brown Institution.
