= Joseph Godwin Greenfield =

Scottish neuropathologist

Joseph Godwin Greenfield FRCP
- Greenfield at the first International Congress of Neuropathologists
- Born: 24 May 1884; Edinburgh
- Died: 2 March 1958 (aged 73); Bethesda, Maryland
- Education: University of Edinburgh
- Spouse: Florence Marie Jaeger
- Scientific career
- Fields: Neuropathology
- Academic advisors: Byrom Bramwell, Alexander Bruce

Joseph Godwin Greenfield, FRCP (24 May 1884 – 2 March 1958) was an early neuropathologist. He created, with 28 founding members, the neuropathological club, which would eventually become the British Neuropathological Society. Greenfield served as pathologist at the National Hospital for Neurology and Neurosurgery at Queen Square.

== Early life ==
Godwin Greenfield was born in Edinburgh, Scotland to William S. Greenfield, who was chair of pathology and clinical medicine at the University of Edinburgh. Godwin Greenfield began his early education at the Edinburgh Academy before becoming a boarder at the Merchiston Castle School.

== Career ==
Greenfield served as house physician under Alexander Bruce and helped arrange lectures for Byrom Bramwell during his first year of residency at Edinburgh Royal Infirmary. He later served as house physician at East London Hospital for Children and at the National Hospital for Neurology and Neurosurgery at Queen Square, London. Greenfield then became assistant pathologist to Matthew Stewart at the General Infirmary at Leeds in 1912, but returned to Queen Square two years later where he became the chair of pathology, a post he held until his retirement in 1949.

During his first few years as pathologist, he also volunteered for a commission from the Royal Army Medical Corps and was deployed in France during World War I, notably serving during the Great Retreat from Mons. In 1917 he was appointed to a RAMC center in Tooting for treatment of nervous system injuries, and returned to his post at Queen's Square at the end of his commission in 1919.

Following the outbreak of World War II 1939, the National Hospital at Queen's Square was evacuated, and Greenfield relocated to Chase Farm Hospital in Enfield Town where he organized pathological services. He returned to London in 1945.

During his career, Greenfield made several significant contributions to the field of neuropathology and received several honors. In 1917, Greenfield took membership in the Royal College of Physicians, earned his MD with a gold medal from the University of Edinburgh in 1921, and was elected a fellow of the college in 1925. During his time at the National Hospital, Greenfield collaborated with Farquhar Buzzard on several publications, including research on von Economo’s encephalitis in 1919 and Pathology of the Nervous System in 1921. Late infantile metachromatic leukodystrophy is occasionally known by the eponym Greenfield's disease because of his work studying its pathophysiology and histology.

Greenfield played an important role in defining neuropathology as a distinct discipline, including lecturing to the Royal College of physicians on 'the pathology of the neuron' in 1939. In 1950, Greenfield and 28 of his colleagues started a 'neuropathological club' to organize discussion of difficult cases and help unify clinical and experimental aspects of the field. This club eventually became the British Neuropathological Society. He organized and lectured at the First International Congress of Neuropathologists in 1952 and presided the Second International Congress of Neuropathologists in 1955.

Godwin Greenfield retired from the National Hospital staff in 1949, but continued research and lecturing and frequently visited the National Institute of Neurological Diseases and Blindness in Bethesda, Maryland. Greenfield died of a heart attack in 1958 following a farewell dinner in Bethesda. His text, Greenfield's Neuropathology, was published posthumously later that year and became an important reference in the field and continues to be developed as a standard reference.
