= Charles Roy =

Charles Roy may refer to:

- Chip Roy (born 1972), American attorney and politician
- Charles Smart Roy (1854–1897), British professor of pathology
- Charlie Roy (1884–1950), American baseball pitcher
