= Bulbous corpuscle =

Skin mechanoreceptor

Ruffini ending
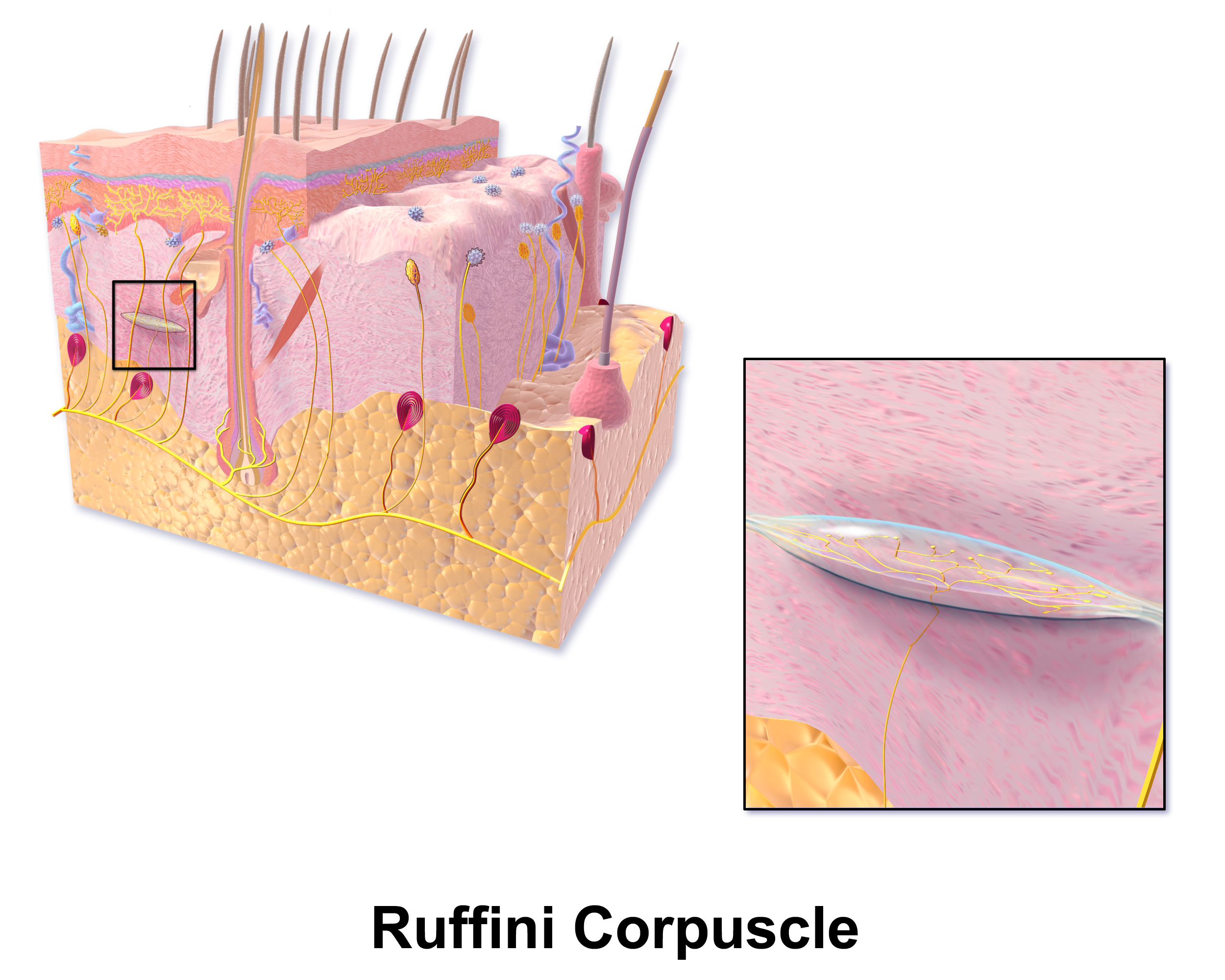

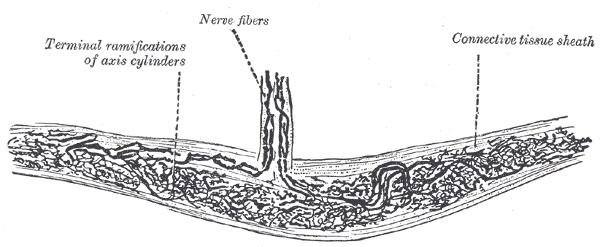
- Nerve ending of Ruffini.

Details
- Part of: Skin
- Function: Mechanoreceptor

Identifiers
- Latin: corpusculum sensorium fusiforme
- TH: H3.11.06.0.00017
- TE: corpuscle_by_E5.17.1.0.2.0.15 E5.17.1.0.2.0.15
- FMA: 83602

The bulbous corpuscle, Ruffini ending or Ruffini corpuscle is a slowly adapting mechanoreceptor located in the cutaneous tissue between the dermal papillae and the hypodermis. It is named after Angelo Ruffini.

== Structure ==
Ruffini corpuscles are enlarged dendritic endings with elongated capsules.

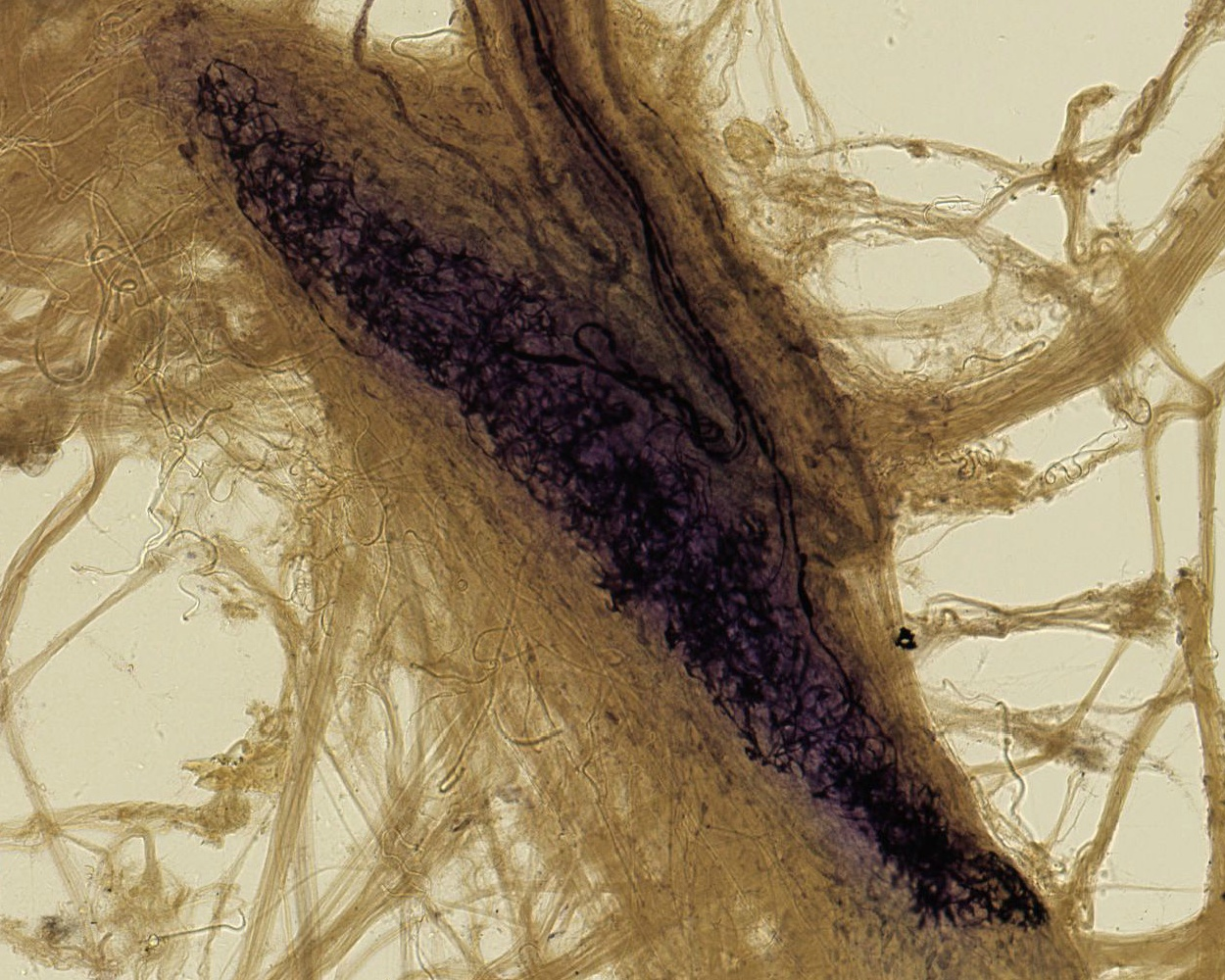
Ruffini corpuscle from original slide sent by Ruffini to Sir Charles Sherrington

== Function ==
This spindle-shaped receptor is sensitive to skin stretch, and contributes to the kinesthetic sense of and control of finger position and movement. They are at the highest density around the fingernails where they act in monitoring slippage of objects along the surface of the skin, allowing modulation of grip on an object.

Ruffini corpuscles respond to sustained pressure and show very little adaptation.

Ruffinian endings are located in the deep layers of the skin, and register mechanical deformation within joints, more specifically angle change, with a specificity of up to 2.75 degrees, as well as continuous pressure states. They also act as thermoreceptors that respond for a long time, so in case of deep burn there will be no pain, as these receptors will be burned off.
