= James Lorrain Smith =

Scottish pathologist (1862–1931)

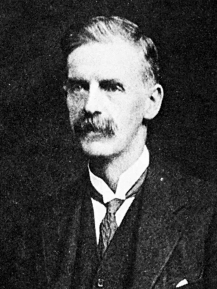
James Lorrain Smith

James Lorrain Smith FRS FRSE FRCPE (21 August 1862 – 18 April 1931) was a Scottish pathologist known for his works in human physiology, especially his research on respiration in collaboration with John Scott Haldane.

== Life ==
He was born in the manse at Half Morton in rural Dumfriesshire the fourth son of Rev Walter Smith who was a Free Church of Scotland minister in the parish. He had several talented siblings, including the mycologist Annie Lorrain Smith, who worked informally at the British Museum. His brother Walter Smith became a professor of philosophy at Lake Forest College in Illinois whilst another brother, William George Smith, became a lecturer in psychology.

Lorrain Smith was educated locally then at George Watson's College in Edinburgh.

He studied for a general Arts, graduating with an MA in 1893 and allowing him to then study medicine at the University of Edinburgh where he graduated with an MB ChB in 1889. He then studied pathology as a postgraduate under Prof John Lucas Walker at the University of Cambridge. He became a Demonstrator under Professor Charles Smart Roy who recommended that he follow his studies at the universities of Strasbourg under Friedrich Daniel von Recklinghausen. He spent some time at Copenhagen where he studied techniques for analysing gases in blood in Christian Bohr's laboratory before moving to teach at the Queen's College, Belfast, becoming a professor in 1901. In 1904 he was elected President of the Ulster Medical Association.

In 1904 he became Professor of Pathology at the University of Manchester and in 1912 moved to the University of Edinburgh to replace Prof William Smith Greenfield. In 1913 he was elected a member of the Harveian Society of Edinburgh. During the First World War he helped to introduce the antiseptic "Eusol" (Edinburgh University Solution) and suggested the idea of using charcoal in gas masks.

Lorrain Smith worked with John Scott Haldane on respiration particularly the transport of oxygen by the blood. The pulmonary condition of intoxication due to excess oxygen or oxygen toxicity is sometimes called "Lorrain Smith effect".

He was elected a Fellow of the Royal Society of London on 6 May 1909. In 1919 he was elected a Fellow of the Royal Society of Edinburgh. His proposers were Sir William Turner, Cargill Gilston Knott, Sir Edmund Taylor Whittaker and Arthur Robinson.

He died on 18 April 1931. A memorial ceremony was held at the University of Edinburgh read by Principal David Cairns. He was cremated at Warriston Crematorium.

== Family ==
In 1895 he married Isabella Edmond. A daughter was born in Belfast on 11 April 1900.

== Publications ==
- Smith, James Lorrain (1932). Growth. Oliver and Boyd. OCLC 683187627.
