= Charles Smart Roy =

British professor of pathology

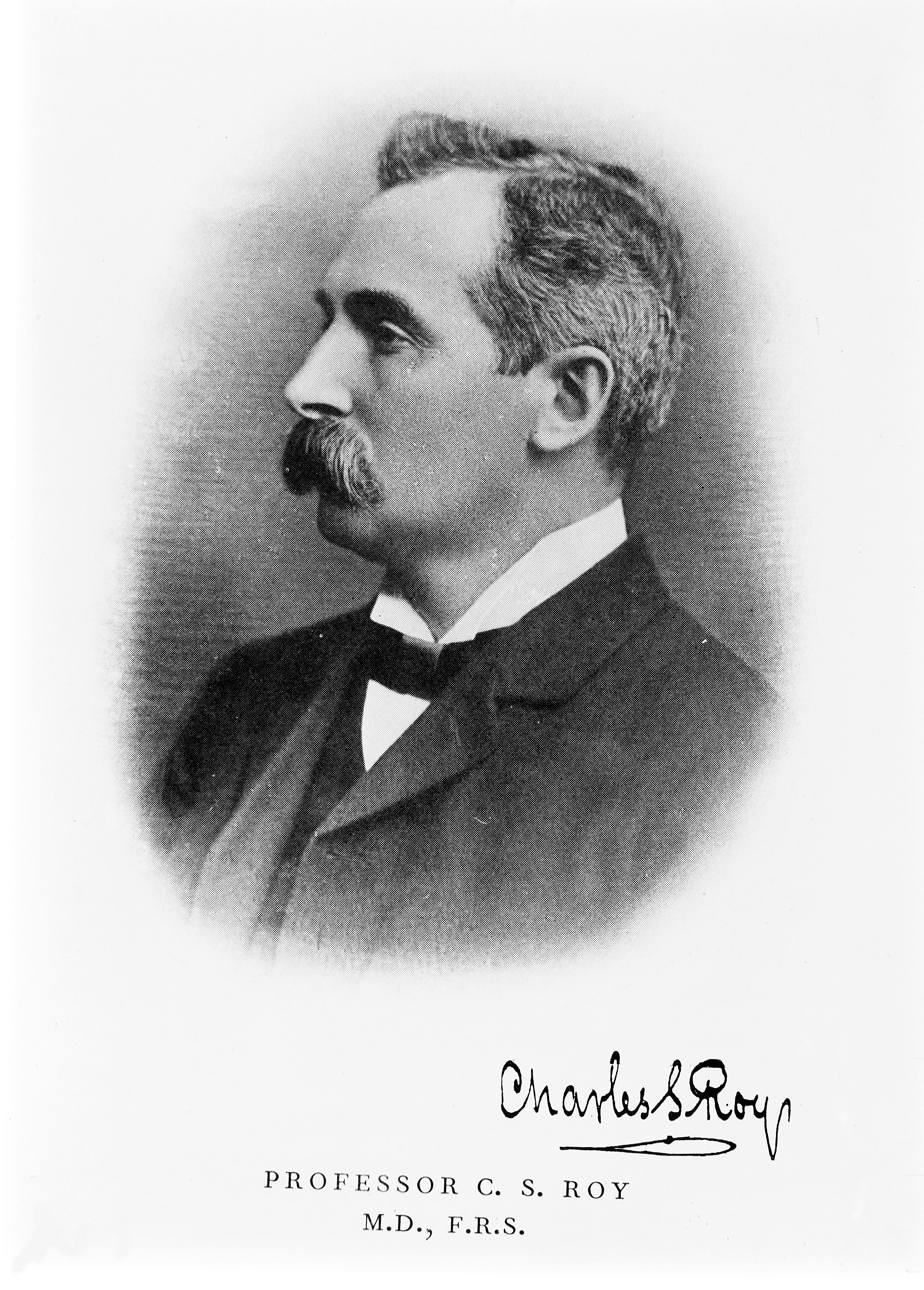

Charles Smart Roy (21 January 1854 – 4 October 1897) was a British professor of pathology who worked at the University of Cambridge.

Roy was born at Arbroath, Forfarshire to Adam Roy, a shipowner. His early education was at his birthplace of Arbroath and later at St. Andrews. He studied medicine at the University of Edinburgh, graduating with distinction in 1875 and joining as a Resident Physician at the Edinburgh Royal Infirmary.

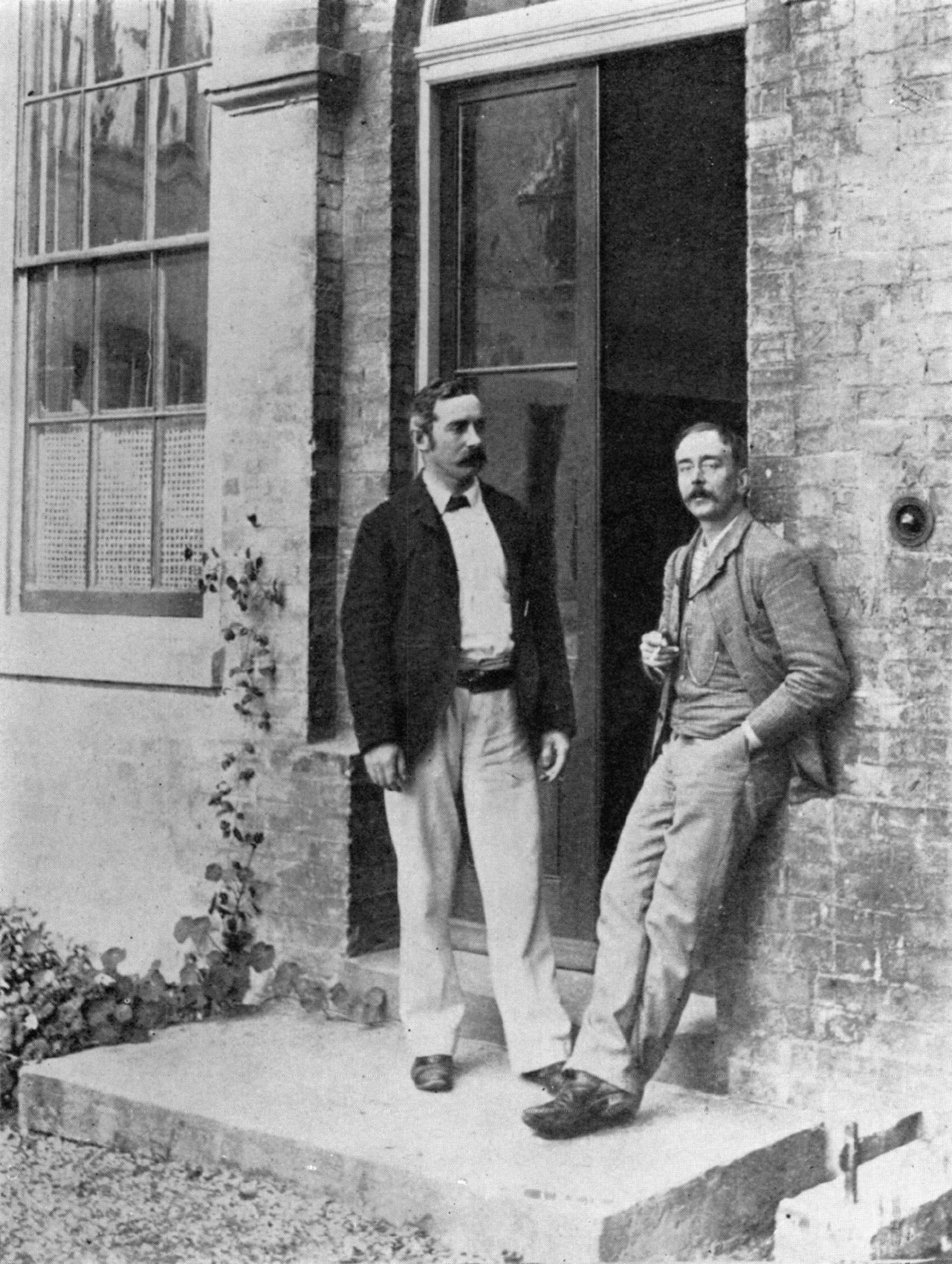
Charles Smart Roy and Charles Scott Sherrington (right), at the door of the Old Pathological Laboratory, Cambridge, 1893

He moved to the Brown Institution in London to conduct research in the physiological aspects of pleuro-pneumonia. During the Turko-Serbian war of 1876 he was in charge of a hospital at Janina in Turkey. After the war he went to Berlin to study under Emil du Bois-Reymond and Rudolf Virchow working on aspects of heart physiology. He obtained an M.D. from Edinburgh with a gold medal. He was invited to the Strasburg Physiological Institute where he worked with F.L. Goltz on blood circulation before moving to Leipzig in 1879 where he worked under Julius Cohnheim.

In 1880 he moved to Cambridge as George Henry Lewes' student, working in the laboratory of Dr. Michael Foster. He taught advanced physiology to students. He succeeded Dr W.S. Greenfield as the director of the Brown Institution.

In 1884 he was elected professor of pathology at the University of Cambridge and Fellow of the Royal Society. He worked with others at the Pathological Laboratory such as Charles Scott Sherrington and several students became eminent pathologists including Ernest Hanbury Hankin, John George Adami and James Lorrain Smith.

He died in Cambridge at the age of 43.
