= Angelo Ruffini =

Angelo Ruffini (Pretare of Arquata del Tronto; 1864–1929) was an Italian histologist and embryologist.

He studied medicine at the University of Bologna, where beginning in 1894 he taught classes in histology. In 1903 he attained the chair of embryology at the University of Siena.

He was the first to describe small encapsulated nerve endings (mechanoreceptors) which were to become known as Ruffini corpuscles. He used a gold chloride stain on his microscope slides in order to view the tiny corpuscles.

Ruffini was a pioneer in the study of amphibian gastrulation, providing a comprehensive and detailed description on the formation of "bottle cells". He published these findings in a book titled Fisiogenia (1925).

== Relationship with Sir Charles Sherrington ==
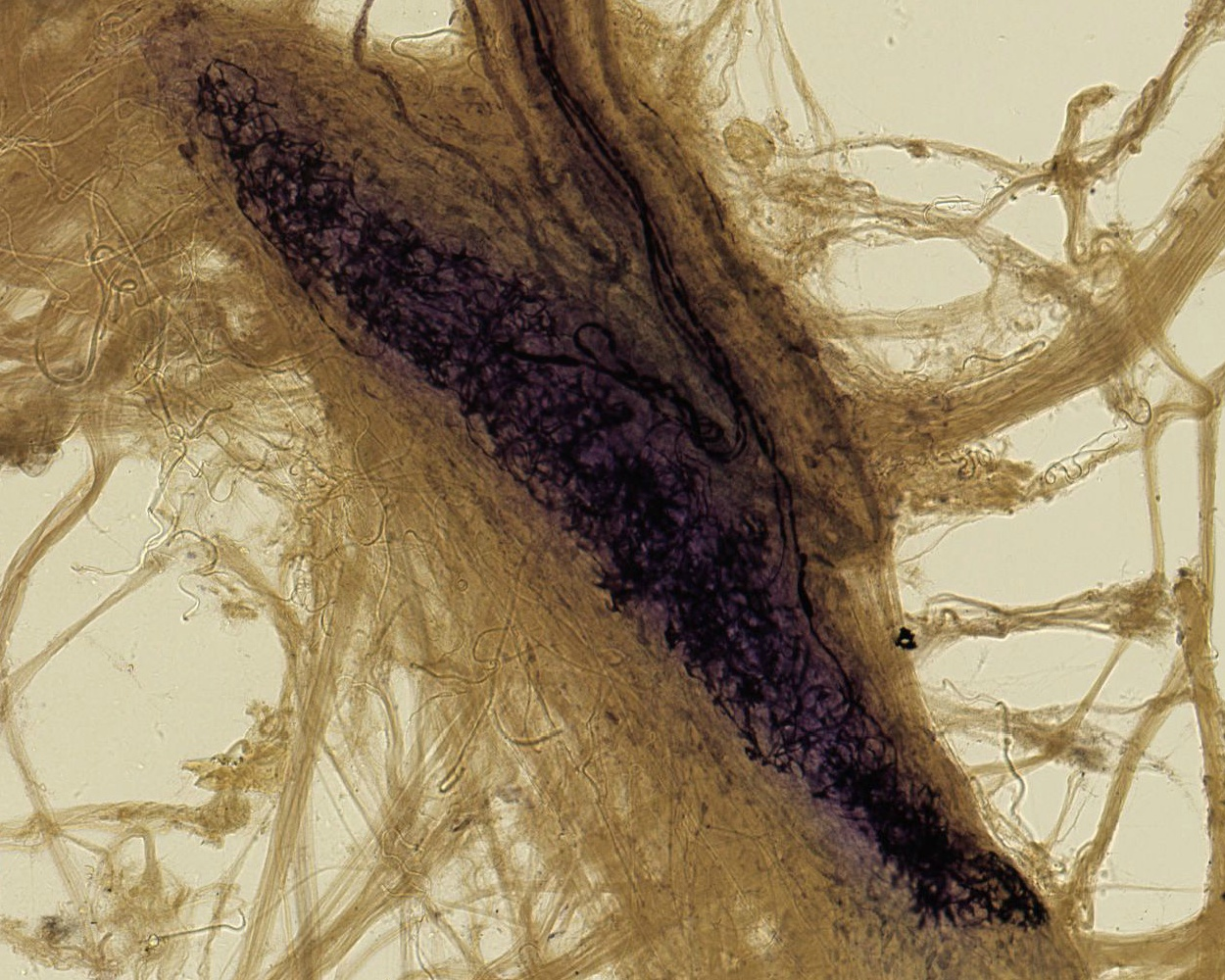
Ruffini corpuscle from original slide sent by Ruffini to Sir Charles Sherrington

Between 1896 and 1903, Ruffini corresponded regularly with Sir Charles Sherrington. This relationship evolved after Ruffini sent copies of his papers on muscle nerve endings to Sherrington. Ruffini also sent Sherrington eleven slides of 'Organi nervosi' (available online) and Sherrington was instrumental in getting Ruffini's work published in the Journal of Physiology.
