= Thomas Gregor Brodie =

British physiologist (1866–1916)

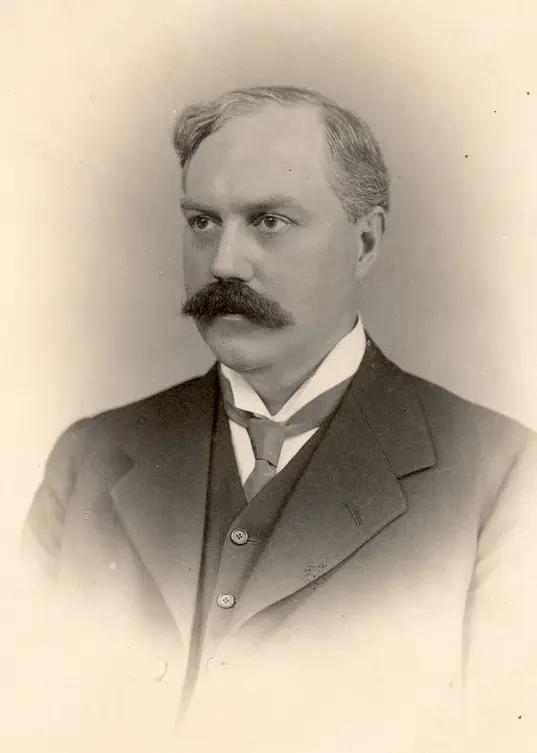
- Born: 8 February 1866; Northampton
- Died: 20 August 1916 (aged 50); Hampstead
- Resting place: Hampstead Cemetery
- Alma mater: St John's College; King's College School; King's College London
- Occupation: Physiologist, writer, lecturer, teacher, director, officer, researcher, inventor, athlete, carpenter
- Employer: Brown Animal Sanatory Institution; King's College Hospital; King's College London; London School of Medicine for Women; Royal College of Physicians; Royal College of Surgeons of England; Royal Veterinary College; St Thomas's Hospital Medical School; University of Toronto (1908–1916)
- Awards: Croonian Medal (1911); Fellow of the Royal Society (1904); Fellow of the Royal Society of Canada (1911)
- Rank: captain, captain (1916–)
- Branch: Canadian Army

Thomas Gregor Brodie FRS FCS (8 February 1866 – 20 August 1916) was a British physiologist, researcher and writer.

== Early life ==
Brodie was born in Northampton on 8 February 1866 to Reverend Alexander Brodie of Grandborough. He was educated at King's College School, St John's College, Cambridge and graduated in medicine from King's College London.

He was appointed as the director of the combined laboratories of the Royal College of Physicians and the Royal College of Surgeons of England in 1899, where he served until their closure in 1902.

In January 1903, he was appointed Professor-Superintendent of the Brown Animal Sanatory Institution, a pathology research centre in London, where he stayed until he became Professor of Physiology at the University of Toronto in 1908.

He was made a Fellow of the Royal Society in 1904 and delivered the Croonian Lecture in 1911. In 1911 he was made a Fellow of the Royal Society of Canada. In the same year, Brodie contributed several articles to the Encyclopædia Britannica Eleventh Edition.

Brodie was also a Fellow of the Chemical Society and a Fellow of King's College London.

Following the start of the first world war, Brodie joined the medical services of the Canadian Army as a captain and accompanied the No. 4 University of Toronto Base Hospital to the United Kingdom in 1916. While in England, he was detached from No. 4 Hospital in order to focus on medical research involving the effects of wounds and disease on respiratory processes. During this research he was appointed Superintendent of a Military Hospital in Ramsgate.

== Personal life and death ==
Brodie married Alice Sims circa 1895 and had three sons. In his spare time he was a keen golfer and cyclist and enjoyed practicing carpentry with his sons.

On 20 August 1916, he was taking breakfast in bed after recovering from a mild case of gout from the previous week. While reading the newspaper following the meal, he suffered a sudden and unexpected heart attack and died. His funeral was held at Hampstead Cemetery with full military honours. Several members of the Canadian armed forces attended the funeral, including major general Guy Carleton Jones.
