= John Newport Langley =

British physiologist

John Newport Langley FRS
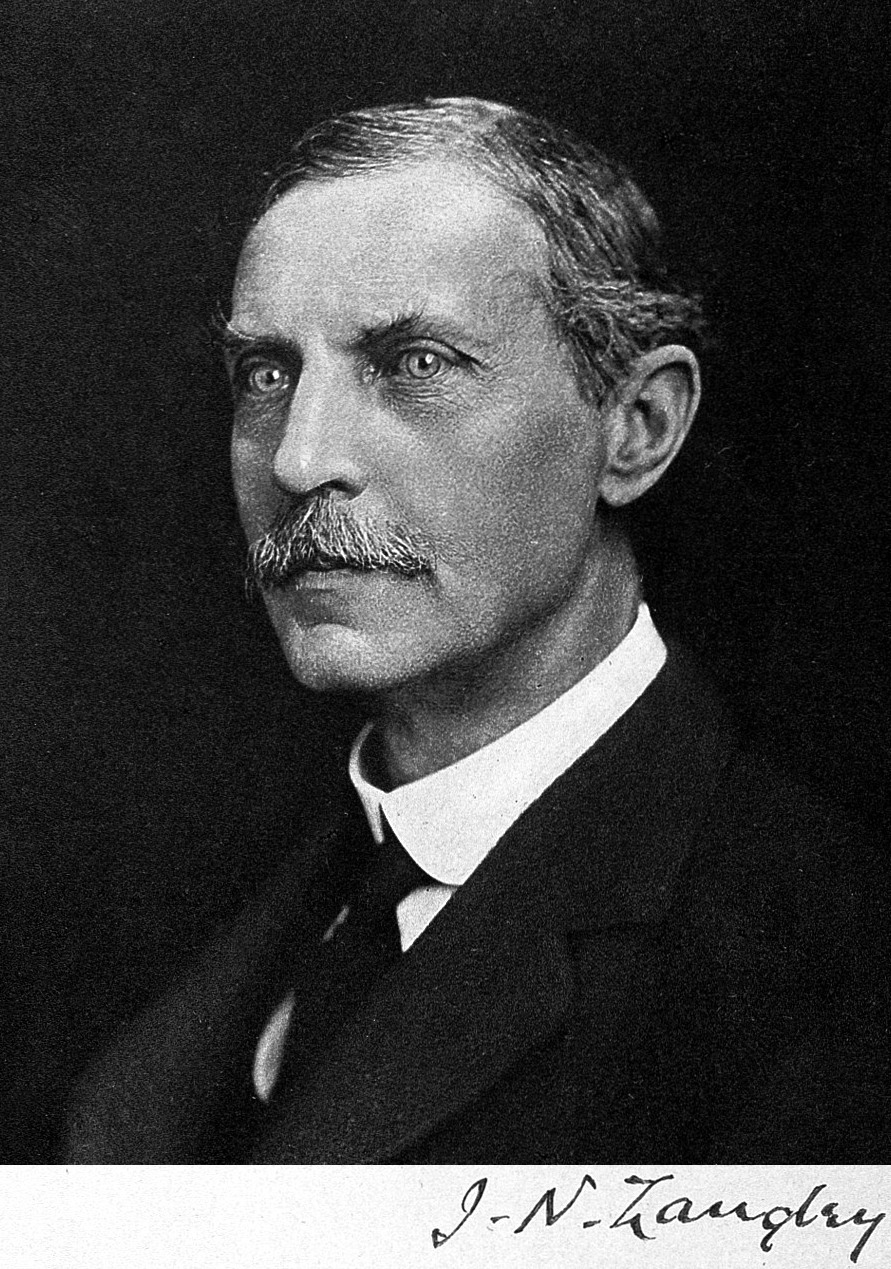
- Born: 2 November 1852; Newbury, England
- Died: 5 November 1925 (aged 73); Cambridge, England
- Education: University of Cambridge
- Known for: Autonomic nervous system Secretion
- Awards: Royal Medal (1892)
- Scientific career
- Fields: Physiologist
- Workplaces: University of Cambridge
- Academic advisors: Michael Foster
- Notable students: Walter Morley Fletcher; Charles Sherrington; Leon Orbeli

Notes
- Fellow of the Royal Society

John Newport Langley FRS (2 November 1852 – 5 November 1925) was a British physiologist, who made substantive discoveries about the nervous system and secretion.

== Life ==
He was born in Newbury, Berkshire the son of John Langley, the local schoolmaster, and his wife, Mary Groom. He was educated at Exeter Grammar School in Devon. In 1871 he won a place at St John's College, Cambridge, where he graduated MA before continuing multiple postgraduate studies, gaining several doctorates.

He spent his entire career at Cambridge University, beginning as a Demonstrator in lectures in 1875. He began lecturing in Physiology in 1884 and was awarded a professorship in 1903, succeeding Professor Michael Foster.

He was elected a Fellow of the Royal Society in 1883 and later its vice-president. He was made an Honorary Fellow of the Royal Society of Edinburgh in 1916.

Langley is known as one of the fathers of the chemical receptor theory, and as the origin of the concept of "receptive substance".

In 1901, he advanced research in neurotransmitters and chemical receptors, working with extracts from adrenal glands. These extracts elicited responses in tissues that were similar to those induced by nerve stimulation.

He coined the term "autonomic nervous system" (ANS) in 1898.

He was the first person who put forward the concept of parasympathetic nervous system as a division of the ANS in 1921.

He died in Cambridge on 5 November 1925, aged 73.

== Publications ==
- The Autonomic Nervous System (1921)
- Elementary Experimental Physiology

== Recognition ==
A brass plaque to Langley's memory exists in Trinity College Chapel at Cambridge University.

== Family ==
Langley married at St. Mary′s church, Montrose, on 10 September 1902 Vera Kathleen Forsythe-Grant (d.1932), third daughter of Frederick Grant Forsyth-Grant, of Ecclesgreig, Kincardineshire.

== Bibliography ==
- Katz, B. (1986). "Archibald Vivian Hill", Dictionary of National Biography, Oxford University Press, Oxford, p. 406
