= List of fellows of the Royal Society elected in 1893 =

Fellows of the Royal Society elected in 1893.

== Fellows ==
1. James Bryce (1838–1922)
2. William Burnside (1852–1927)
3. Wyndham Rowland Dunstan (1861–1949)
4. William Ellis (1828–1916)
5. James Cossar Ewart (1851–1933)
6. William Tennant Gairdner (1824–1907)
7. Ernest William Hobson (1856–1933)
8. Henry Hoyle Howorth (1842–1923)
9. Edwin Tulley Newton (1840–1930)
10. Sir Charles Scott Sherrington (1857–1952) Nobel laureate
11. Edward Charles Stirling (1848–1919)
12. John Isaac Thornycroft (1843–1928)
13. James William Helenus Trail (1851–1919)
14. Alfred Russel Wallace (1823–1913)
15. Arthur Mason Worthington (1852–1916)
16. Sydney Young (1857–1937)

== Royal members ==
1. George V (1865–1936) Patron
