= Alexander Bruce (neurologist) =

Scottish surgeon, neurologist, editor and publisher

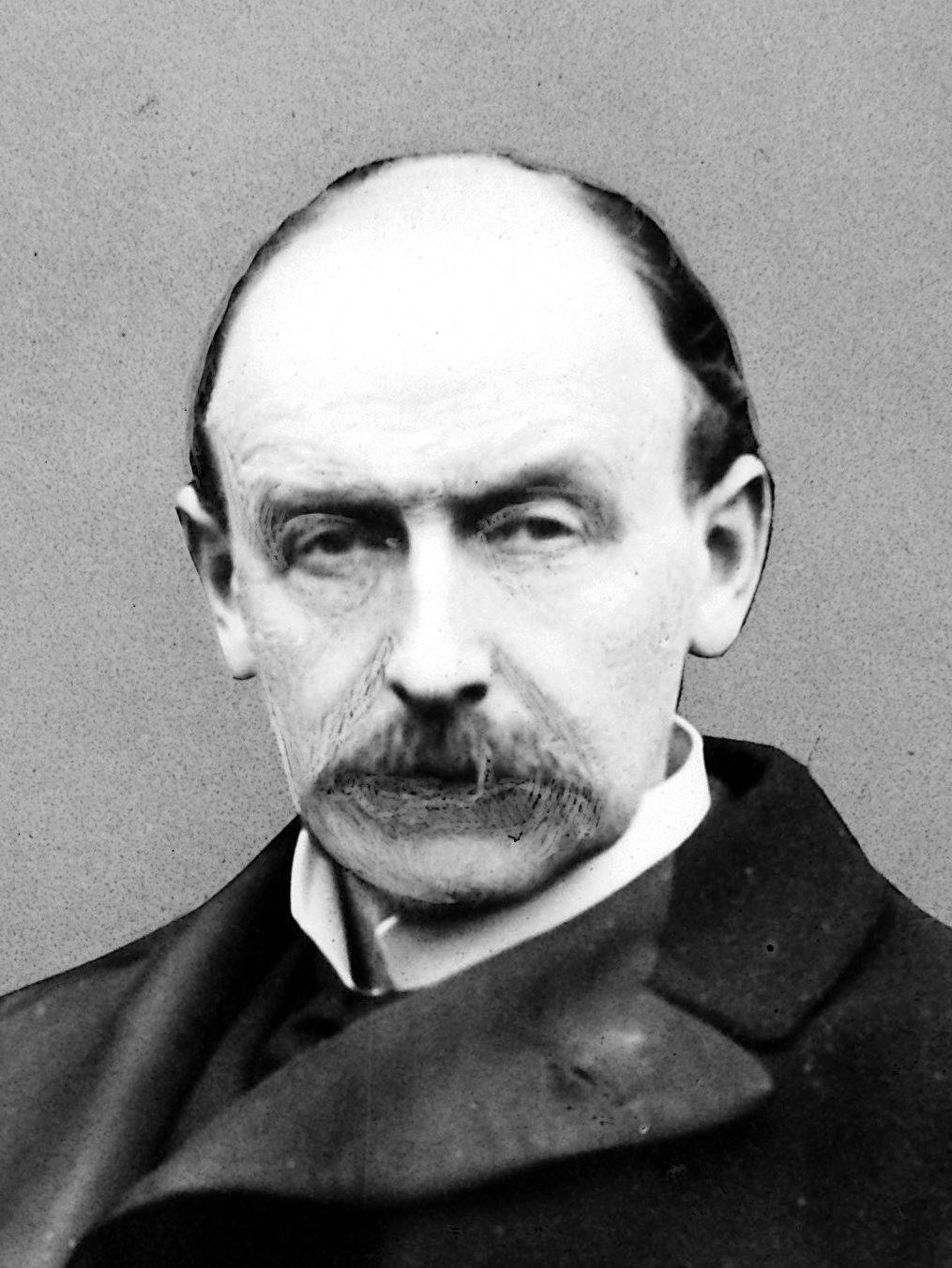
Portrait of Alexander Bruce cropped Wellcome M0005972

Alexander Bruce (1854–1911) was a Scottish surgeon, neurologist and editor and publisher of The Review of Neurology and Psychiatry. He was an early advocate of the now largely discredited use of electrotherapy in the treatment of mental health disorders.

== Life ==
He was born in Ardiffery near Cruden, Aberdeenshire to Alexander Bruce and Mary Milne. He was educated at Chanonry School in Aberdeen.

He attended the University of Aberdeen and then went on to the University of Edinburgh, finishing his studies in 1879. He worked as the resident neurologist an Edinburgh Royal Infirmary and then the West Riding Asylum in Yorkshire, before returning to Edinburgh Royal Infirmary where he remained for the rest of his working life.

He was elected a Fellow of the Royal Society of Edinburgh in 1882 and received the Society's Keith Medal for 1905–7.

He died at his home, 8 Ainslie Place, in Edinburgh's West End, on 4 June 1911.

== Memorials ==
The Wellcome Museum of Anatomy and Pathology in London holds a recreation of Dr Alexander Bruce's Electrotherapy Room, 1905

== Family ==
He was married to Annie Louisa Connell. Their son, Alexander Ninian Bruce (d.1968) was also a neurologist, working in both Bangour Hospital and Jordanburn Nerve Hospital.

Their daughter, Annie Louisa Bruce, married another eminent neurologist, Dr Samuel Alexander Kinnier Wilson.
