= William Smith Greenfield =

British anatomist

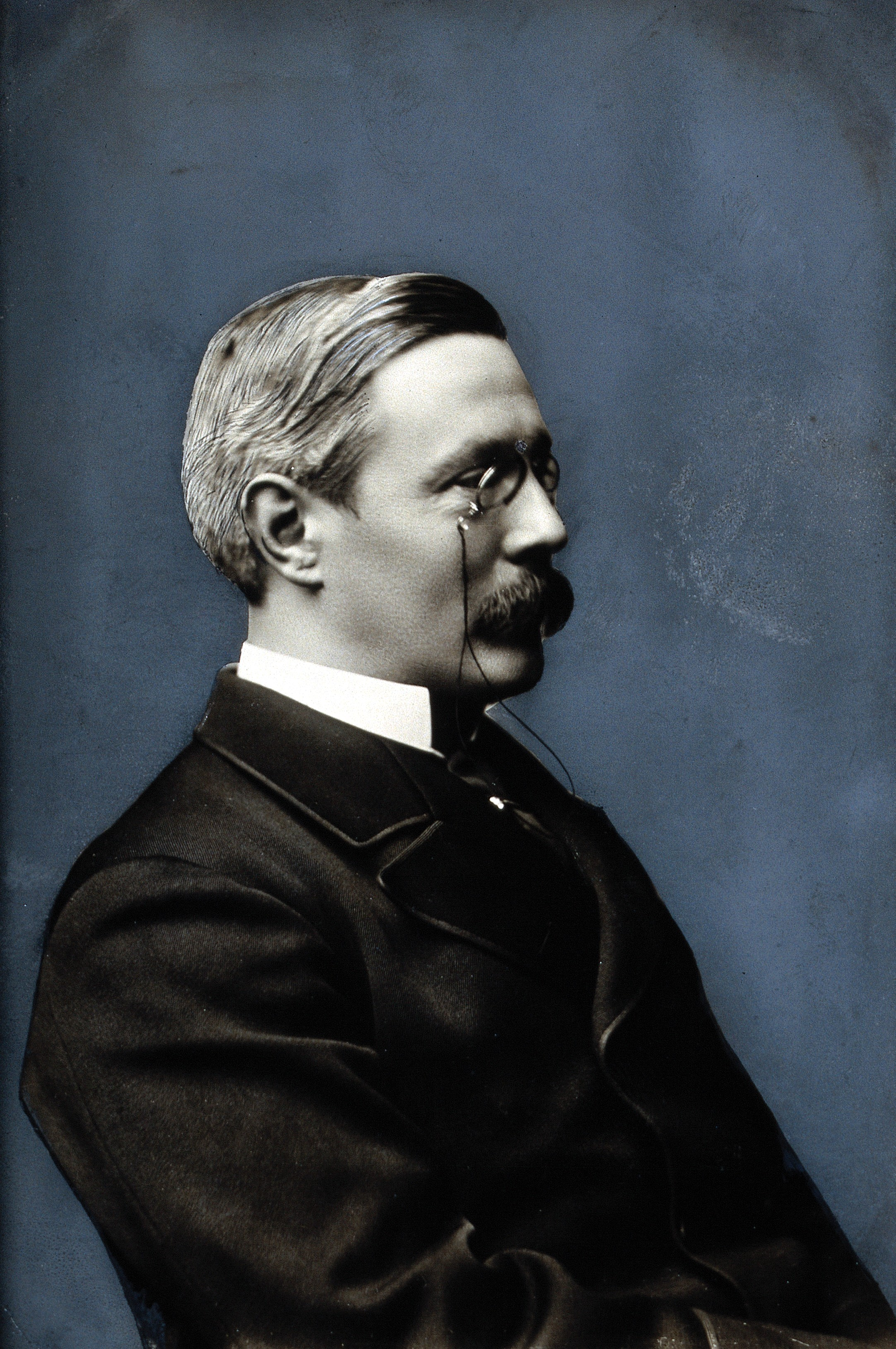
Portrait of Greenfield

William Smith Greenfield FRSE FRCPE LLD (1846–1919) was a British anatomist. He was an expert on anthrax.

== Life ==
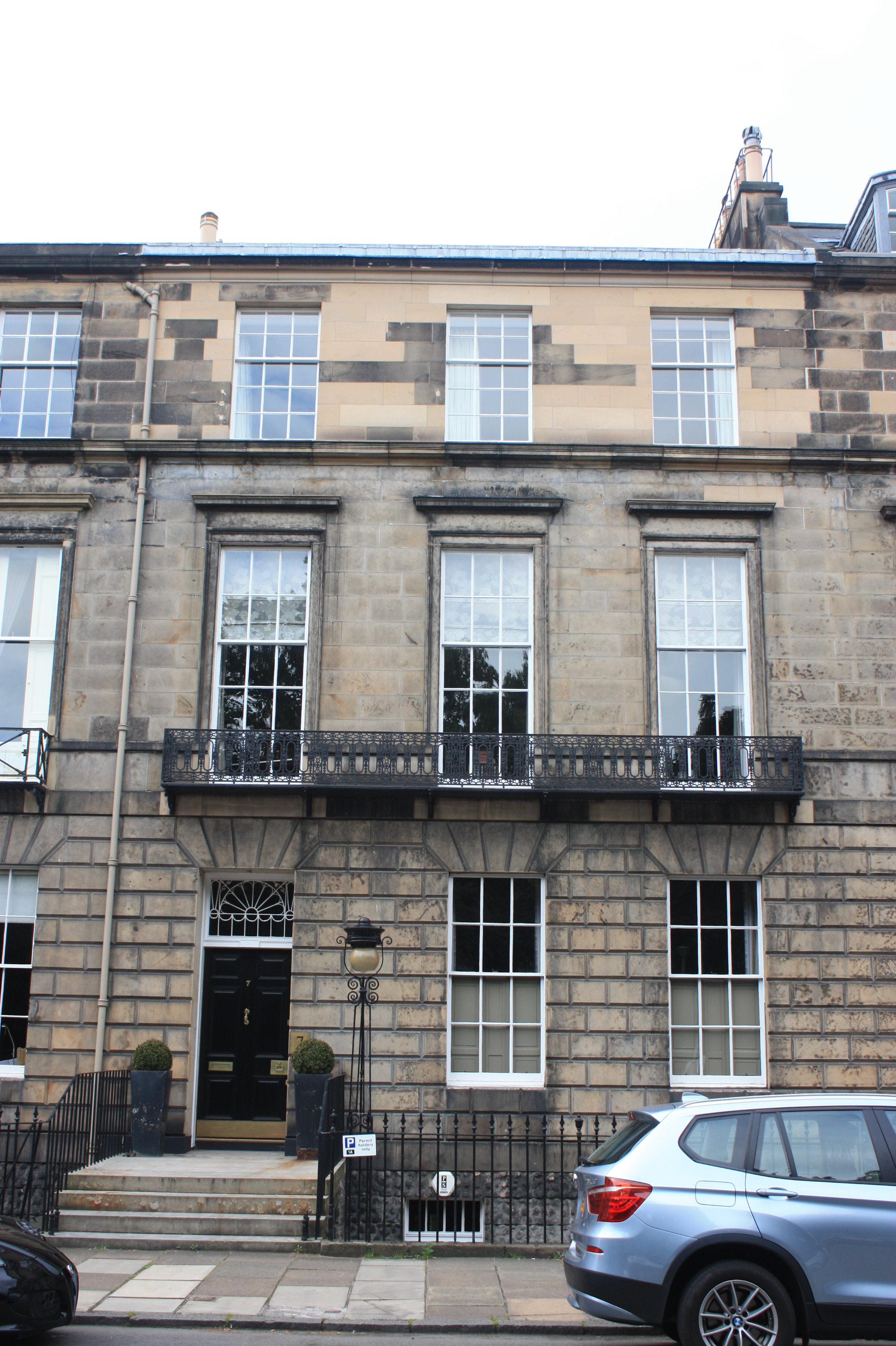
7 Heriot Row, Edinburgh

He was born in Salisbury, Wiltshire on 9 January 1846. He studied medicine at the University of London graduating MB BS in 1872. In 1878 he succeeded John Burdon-Sanderson as professor of pathology at the Brown Institute. In 1881 he went to Edinburgh to become professor of pathology and clinical medicine.

In 1884, he lived at 7 Heriot Row, a Georgian terraced townhouse in Edinburgh's Second New Town.

In 1886, he was elected a Fellow of the Royal Society of Edinburgh. His proposers were Sir William Turner, James Cossar Ewart, Robert Gray and Peter Guthrie Tait.

In 1893, he gave the Bradshaw Lecture to the Royal College of Physicians. In 1893 he was also elected a member of the Harveian Society of Edinburgh.

He retired to Elie in Fife in 1912, being succeeded by Prof James Lorrain Smith. He died in Juniper Green south of Edinburgh on 12 August 1919.

== Family ==
Deeply evangelical, one of his sons became a minister, and two of his daughters became Christian missionaries in India. Sons, Thomas Challen Greenfield BSc, A.M.Inst CE, M. Inst W.E., Water Engineer; Godwin Greenfield, a noted Neuropathologist founding the British Neuropathological Society.

== Artistic recognition ==
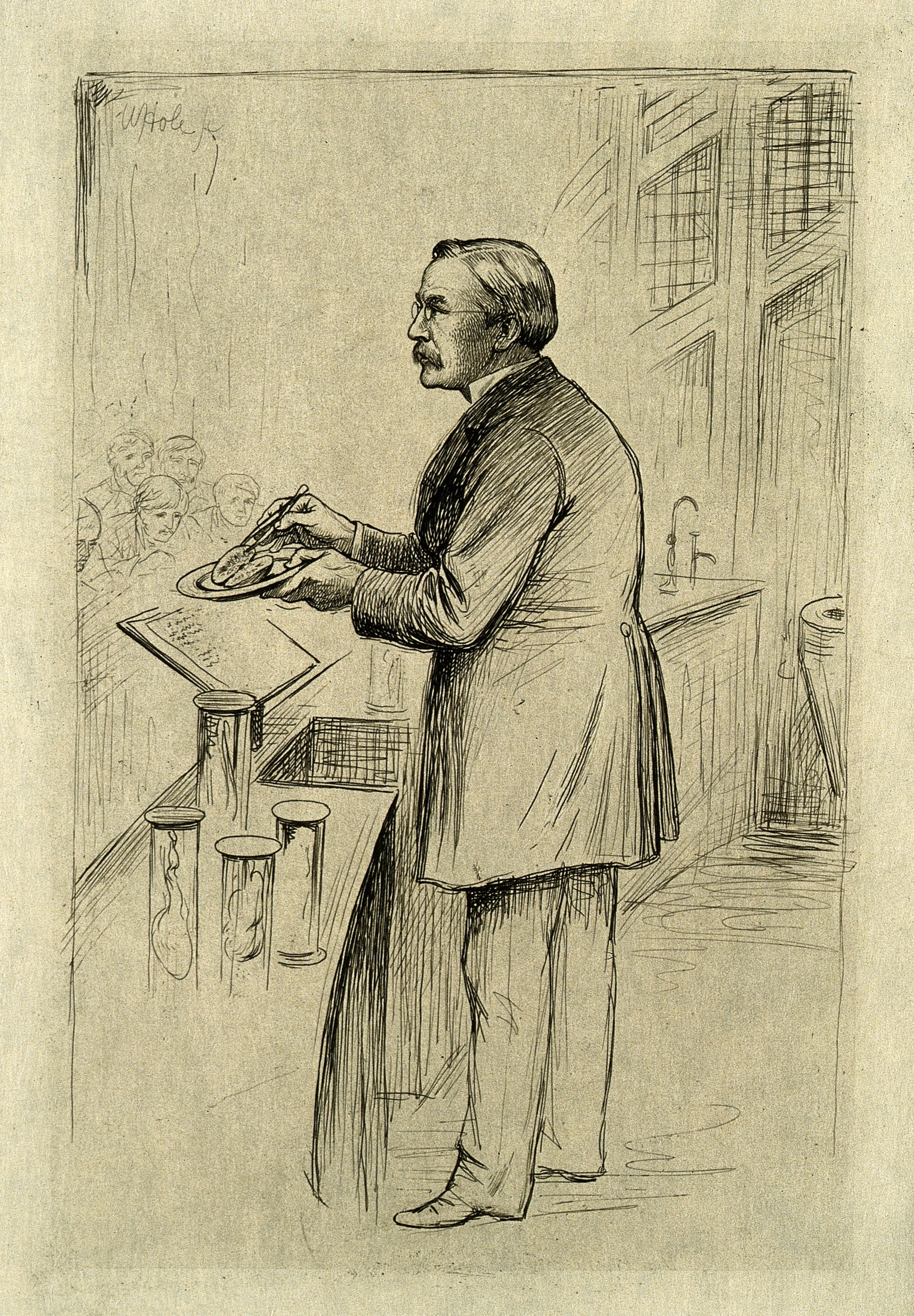
1884 sketched portrait by W.B. Hole. Credit: Wellcome Library

His sketch portrait of 1884, by William Brassey Hole, is held by the Scottish National Portrait Gallery.

== Publications ==
- Health Primers (1879)
- Pathology (1886)
- Cirrhosis of the Liver in Cats (1888)
