= British Neuropathological Society =

The British Neuropathological Society is a professional organisation dedicated to the science of neuropathology. It is one of several national societies composed of neuropathologists. These national groups are members of the International Society of Neuropathology (ISN) which was formed in May 1967, derived from a previous international group of neuropathologists formed in 1950.

== Objectives ==
The object of the Society is to further the study of neuropathology, to promote the exchange of scientific and professional information by means of regular meetings, lectures and publications, and to provide the opportunity for discussions between neuropathologists in Britain and 'overseas'.

== History ==
Godwin Greenfield is regarded as the founding father of the British Neuropathological Society. His career had spanned the years during which neuropathology began to be recognised as a specialty, rather than as merely applied neurology or psychiatry, and he was one of the first to regard himself as a neuropathologist.

By the time he retired from Queen Square in 1949 the advent of the National Health Service had seen the establishment of neurosurgical centres throughout the country, many with neuropathologists already in post. In 1950 with a group of senior colleagues Greenfield started the Neuropathological Club, with 28 founder members. The Club served two useful purposes. It had an important educational function, allowing members of the different schools of neuropathology that had sprung up around the country the opportunity to get together to discuss problem cases, and it united those who had a major clinical commitment in neuropathology with those concerned principally with experimental work.

Two years later in 1952 the first International Congress of Neuropathology was held in Rome. This was not to everyone's approval: the neurologist Sir Francis Walshe commented with dismay that separate international meetings for neuropathologists and neurosurgeons tore “the seamless garment of neurology”.In 1962 the club had grown sufficiently for it to become more formal, and the name was changed to the British Neuropathological Society (BNS).1967 saw the founding of the International Society of Neuropathology, in which BNS members have played an active role, providing four of the Secretaries-General and two of the Presidents to date.

In 1975 the BNS launched Neuropathology and Applied Neurobiology, which has become one of the major neuropathology journals

By the year 2000, when the British Neuropathological Society celebrated its 50th anniversary, there were more than 200 active members.
