= Heneage Gibbes =

British pathologist

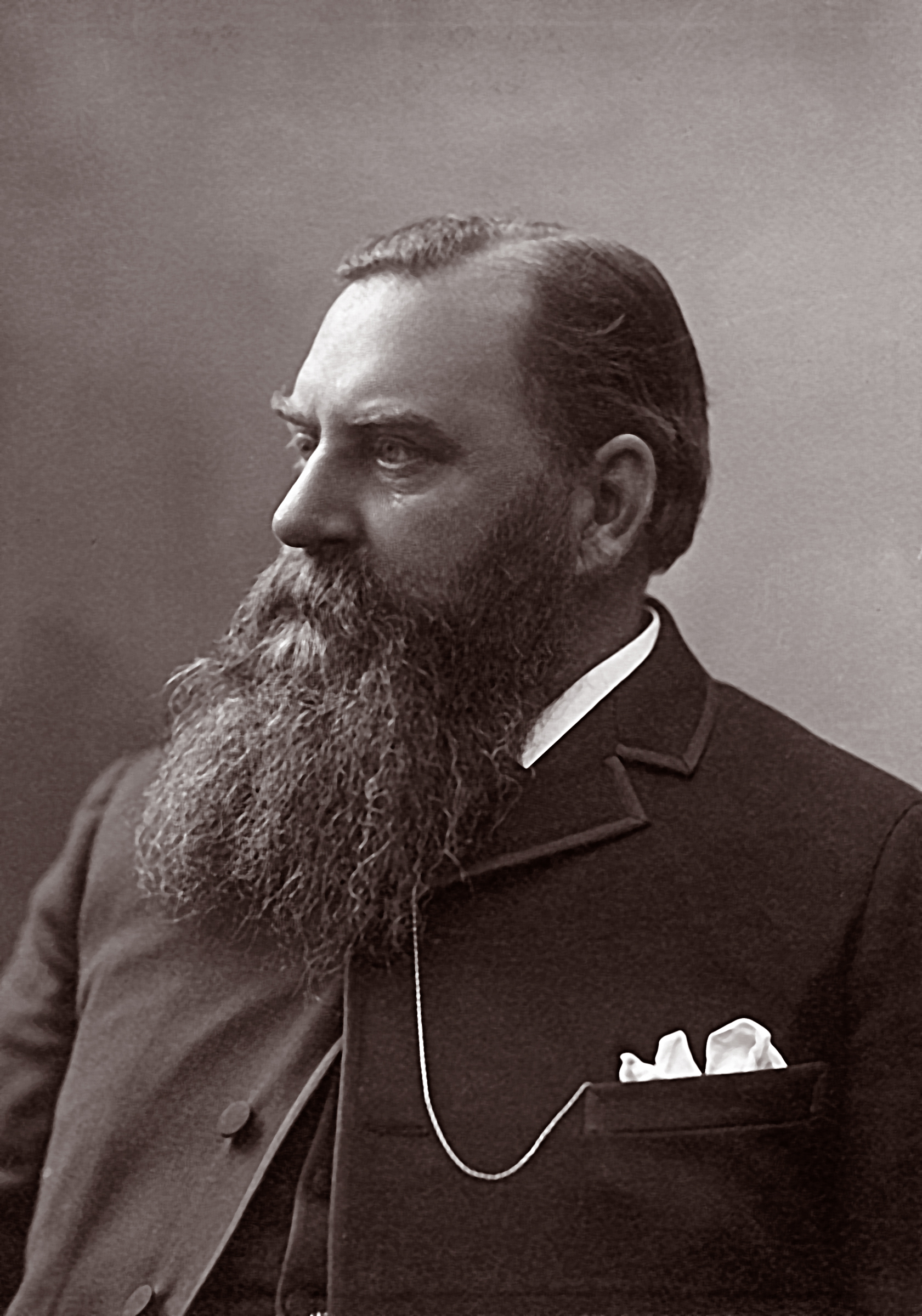
- Born: 1837; Somerset, England
- Died: July 18, 1912 (aged 74–75); McAlester, Oklahoma
- Education: University of Aberdeen
- Occupations: Professor, physician

Heneage Gibbes (1837 – July 18, 1912) was a British pathologist known for his histological studies. He moved to the United States where he served as a professor of pathology at the University of Michigan, Ann Arbor.

Gibbes was born in Berrow, Somerset, where his namesake father was a minister while his mother Margaretta was the daughter of John Murray, an admiral in the Royal Navy. His paternal great-grandfather, Sir George Smith Gibbes (1771–1851) was physician extraordinary to Queen Charlotte while his maternal grandfather John Murray was an Admiral in the Royal Navy. At the age of fourteen, he rebelled against his father's plan to train for the clergy, and he left home to sail to the East Indies and returned only at the age of twenty one. He then studied under private tutors and went to the University of Aberdeen. He became a licentiate of the Royal College of Physicians in 1879 and in 1887 he became Professor of Physiology and Normal and Morbid Histology at Westminster Hospital Medical School. He was a curator of the anatomical museum at King's College. He was a student of Emanuel Edward Klein and in 1884, the two were appointed to the British cholera commission and sent to India. This commission was set up to investigate the claims of Robert Koch, who had identified the cause of cholera. Klein and Gibbes found fault in Koch's determination of the causal agent.

Gibbes moved to Ann Arbor, Michigan in 1888 to succeed Alonzo B. Palmer as professor of pathology at the University of Michigan. During his tenure at Michigan, he often held out-dated theories of disease causation despite considerable advances in bacteriology. He claimed that phthisis and tuberculosis were separate diseases and that the tubercle bacillus was not proven as the cause of either. In 1895 he moved to Detroit in 1898 to become the city's Health Officer and Professor of Internal Medicine and Pathology at the Michigan College of Medicine and Surgery.

He wrote two books, Practical Histology (1880) and Practical pathology and morbid anatomy (1891).

He died in McAlester, Oklahoma on July 18, 1912.
