= Charles Scott Sherrington =

English footballer, neurophysiologist and Nobel Prize recipient (1857–1952)

Professor Sir Charles Scott Sherrington OM GBE FRS FRCP FRCS
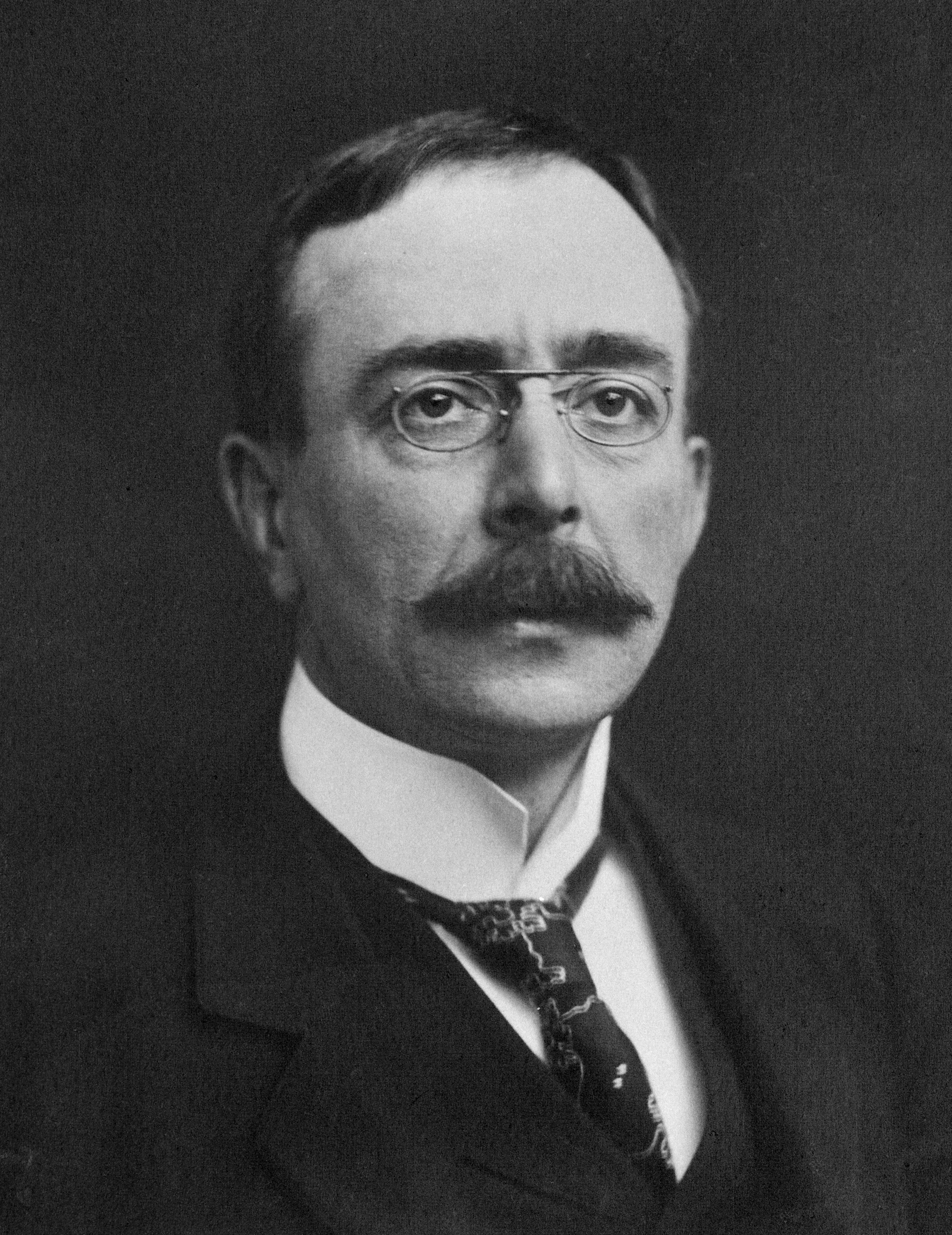

43rd President of the Royal Society
- In office 1920–1925
- Preceded by: J. J. Thomson
- Succeeded by: Ernest Rutherford

Personal details
- Born: 27 November 1857 Islington, Middlesex, England
- Died: 4 March 1952 (aged 94) Eastbourne, Sussex, England
- Scientific career
- Education: Royal College of Surgeons of England; Gonville and Caius College, Cambridge
- Awards: Royal Medal (1905); Copley Medal (1927); Nobel Prize in Physiology or Medicine (1932)
- Fields: Physiology; Pathology; Histology; Neurology; Bacteriology
- Workplaces: King's College, London; University of Liverpool; University of Oxford
- Academic advisors: Michael Foster; John Newport Langley
- Doctoral students: John Farquhar Fulton; John Carew Eccles; Howard Florey

Sir Charles Scott Sherrington (27 November 1857 – 4 March 1952) was a British neurophysiologist and academic. His experimental research established many aspects of contemporary neuroscience, including the concept of the spinal reflex as a system involving connected neurons (the "neuron doctrine"), and how signal transmission between neurons can be potentiated or depotentiated. Sherrington himself coined the word "synapse" to define the connection between two neurons. His book The Integrative Action of the Nervous System (1906) is a synthesis of this work, in recognition of which he was awarded the Nobel Prize in Physiology or Medicine in 1932 (along with Edgar Adrian).

In addition to his work in physiology, Sherrington did research in histology, bacteriology, and pathology. He was president of the Royal Society in the early 1920s.

== Early life ==
Official biographies claim Charles Scott Sherrington was born in Islington, London, England, on 27 November 1857, and that he was the son of James Norton Sherrington, a country doctor, and his wife, Anne Thurtell. However, James Norton Sherrington was an ironmonger and artist's colourman in Great Yarmouth, not a doctor, and died in Yarmouth in 1848, nearly 9 years before Charles was born.

In the 1861 census, Charles is recorded as Charles Scott (boarder, 4, born India) with Anne Sherrington (widow) as the head and Caleb Rose (visitor, married, surgeon). He was brought up in this household with Caleb recorded as head in 1871, although Anne and Caleb did not marry until after the death of his wife in 1880.

The relationship between Charles and his childhood family is unknown. During the 1860s the whole family moved to Anglesea Road, Ipswich, reputedly because London exacerbated Caleb Rose's tendency to asthma.

Sherrington's origins have been discussed in several published sources: Chris Moss and Susan Hunter, in the Journal of Medical Biography of January 2018, presented an article discussing the potential origins of Charles Sherrington, i.e. whether he was born in India of unknown parents, or was the illegitimate child of Caleb Rose and Anne Sherrington.

Erling Norrby, PhD, in Nobel Prizes and Notable Discoveries (2016) observed: "His family origin apparently is not properly given in his official biography. Considering that motherhood is a matter of fact and fatherhood a matter of opinion, it can be noted that his father was not James Norton Sherrington, from whom his family name was derived. Charles was born 9 years after the death of his presumed father. Instead, Charles and his two brothers were the illegitimate sons of Caleb Rose, a highly regarded Ipswich surgeon."

In Ipswich Town: A History, Susan Gardiner writes: "George and William Sherrington, along with their older brother, Charles, were almost certainly the illegitimate sons of Anne Brookes, née Thurtell, and Caleb Rose, a leading surgeon from Ipswich, with whom she was living in College Road, Islington at the time that all three boys were born. No father was named in the baptism register of St James' Church, Clerkenwell, and there is no official record of the registration of any of their births. It was claimed they were the sons of a country doctor, James Norton Sherrington. However, it was with Caleb Rose that Anne and the three Sherrington boys moved to Anglesea Road, Ipswich in 1860, and the couple were married in 1880 after Caleb's first wife had died."

Judith Swazey, in Reflexes and Motor Integration: Sherrington's Concept of Integrative Action (1969), quotes Charles Scott Sherrington's son, Carr Sherrington: "James N. Sherrington was always called Mr. and I have no knowledge that he was a Dr. either in law or in medicine... [He] was mainly interested in art and was a personal friend of J. B. Crone and other painters."

Caleb Rose was noteworthy as both a classical scholar and an archaeologist. At the family's Edgehill House in Ipswich one could find a fine selection of paintings, books, and geological specimens. Through Rose's interest in the Norwich School of Painters, Sherrington gained a love of art. Intellectuals frequented the house regularly. It was this environment that fostered Sherrington's academic sense of wonder. Even before matriculation, the young Sherrington had read Johannes Müller's Elements of Physiology. The book was given to him by Caleb Rose.

Sherrington entered Ipswich School in 1871. Thomas Ashe, a famous English poet, taught at the school. Ashe served as an inspiration to Sherrington, instilling a love of classics and the desire to travel.

Rose had pushed Sherrington towards medicine. Sherrington first began to study with the Royal College of Surgeons of England. He also sought to study at Cambridge, but a bank failure had devastated the family's finances. Sherrington elected to enroll at St Thomas' Hospital in September 1876 as a "perpetual pupil". He did so in order to allow his two younger brothers to do so ahead of him. The two studied law there. Medical studies at St. Thomas's Hospital were intertwined with studies at Gonville and Caius College, Cambridge. Physiology was Sherrington's chosen major at Cambridge. There, he studied under the "father of British physiology," Sir Michael Foster.

Sherrington played football for his grammar school, and for Ipswich Town Football Club; he played rugby for St. Thomas's, was on the rowing team at Oxford. During June 1875, Sherrington passed his preliminary examination in general education at the Royal College of Surgeons of England (RCS). This preliminary exam was required for Fellowship, and also exempted him from a similar exam for the Membership. In April 1878, he passed his Primary Examination for the Membership of the RCS, and twelve months later the Primary for Fellowship.

In October 1879, Sherrington entered Cambridge as a non-collegiate student. The following year he entered Gonville and Caius College. Sherrington was a first-rate student. In June 1881, he took Part I in the Natural Sciences Tripos (NST) and was awarded a Starred first in physiology; there were nine candidates in all (eight men, one woman), of whom five gained First-class honours (Firsts); in June 1883, in Part II of the NST, he also gained a First, alongside William Bateson. Walter Holbrook Gaskell, one of Sherrington's tutors, informed him in November 1881 that he had earned the highest marks for his year in botany, human anatomy, and physiology; second in zoology; and highest overall. John Newport Langley was Sherrington's other tutor. The two were interested in how anatomical structure is expressed in physiological function.

Sherrington earned his Membership of the Royal College of Surgeons on 4 August 1884. In 1885, he obtained a First Class in the Natural Science Tripos with the mark of distinction. In the same year, Sherrington earned the degree of M.B., Bachelor of Medicine and Surgery from Cambridge. In 1886, Sherrington added the title of L.R.C.P., Licentiate of the Royal College of Physicians.

== Seventh International Medical Congress ==
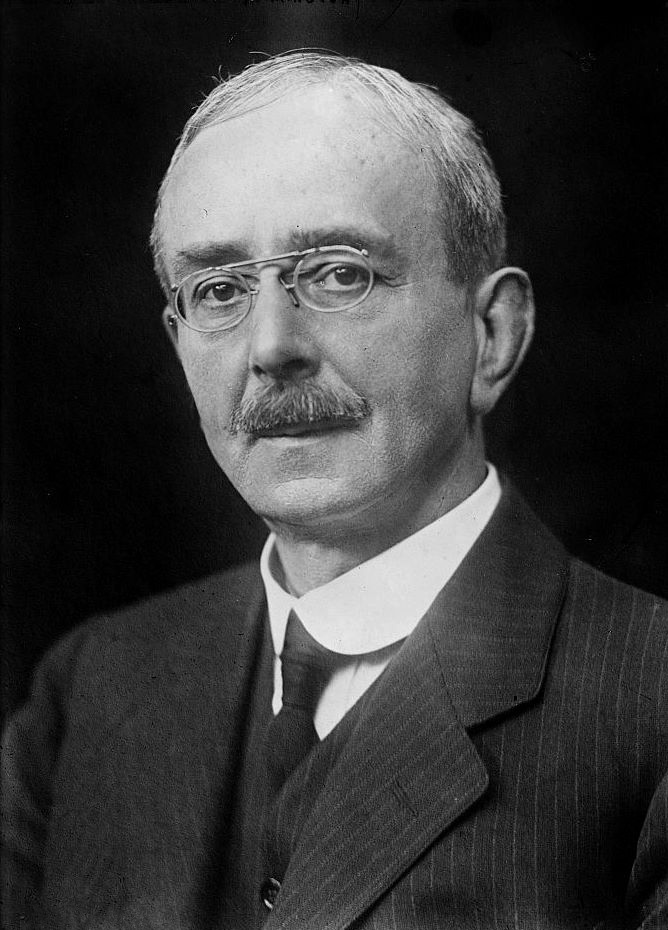
Charles Scott Sherrington

The 7th International Medical Congress was held in London in 1881. It was at this conference that Sherrington began his work in neurological research. At the conference, controversy broke out. Friedrich Goltz of Strasbourg argued that localized function in the cortex did not exist. Goltz came to this conclusion after observing dogs who had parts of their brains removed. David Ferrier, who became a hero of Sherrington's, disagreed. Ferrier maintained that there was localization of function in the brain. Ferrier's strongest evidence was a monkey who suffered from hemiplegia, paralysis affecting one side of the body only, after a cerebral lesion.

A committee, including Langley, was set up to investigate. Both the dog and the monkey were chloroformed. The right hemisphere of the dog was delivered to Cambridge for examination. Sherrington performed a histological examination of the hemisphere, acting as a junior colleague to Langley. In 1884, Langley and Sherrington reported on their findings in a paper. The paper was the first for Sherrington.

== Travel ==
In the winter of 1884–1885, Sherrington left England for Strasbourg. There, he worked with Goltz. Goltz, like many others, positively influenced Sherrington. Sherrington later said of Goltz that: "[h]e taught one that in all things only the best is good enough."

A case of asiatic cholera had broken out in Spain in 1885. A Spanish doctor claimed to have produced a vaccine to fight the outbreak. Under the auspices of Cambridge University, the Royal Society of London, and the Association for Research in Medicine, a group was put together to travel to Spain to investigate. C.S. Roy, J. Graham Brown, and Sherrington formed the group. Roy was Sherrington's friend and the newly elected professor of pathology at Cambridge. As the three travelled to Toledo, Sherrington was skeptical of the Spanish doctor. Upon returning, the three presented a report to the Royal Society. The report discredited the Spaniard's claim.

Sherrington did not meet Santiago Ramón y Cajal on this trip. While Sherrington and his group remained in Toledo, Cajal was hundreds of miles away in Zaragoza. Later that year, Sherrington travelled to Rudolf Virchow in Berlin to inspect the cholera specimens he procured in Spain. Virchow later on sent Sherrington to Robert Koch for a six-week course in technique. Sherrington ended up staying with Koch for a year to do research in bacteriology. Under these two, Sherrington parted with a good foundation in physiology, morphology, histology, and pathology. During this period he may have also studied with Waldeyer and Zuntz.

In 1886, Sherrington went to Italy to again investigate a cholera outbreak. While in Italy, Sherrington spent much time in art galleries. It was in this country that Sherrington's love for rare books became an obsession.

== Career ==
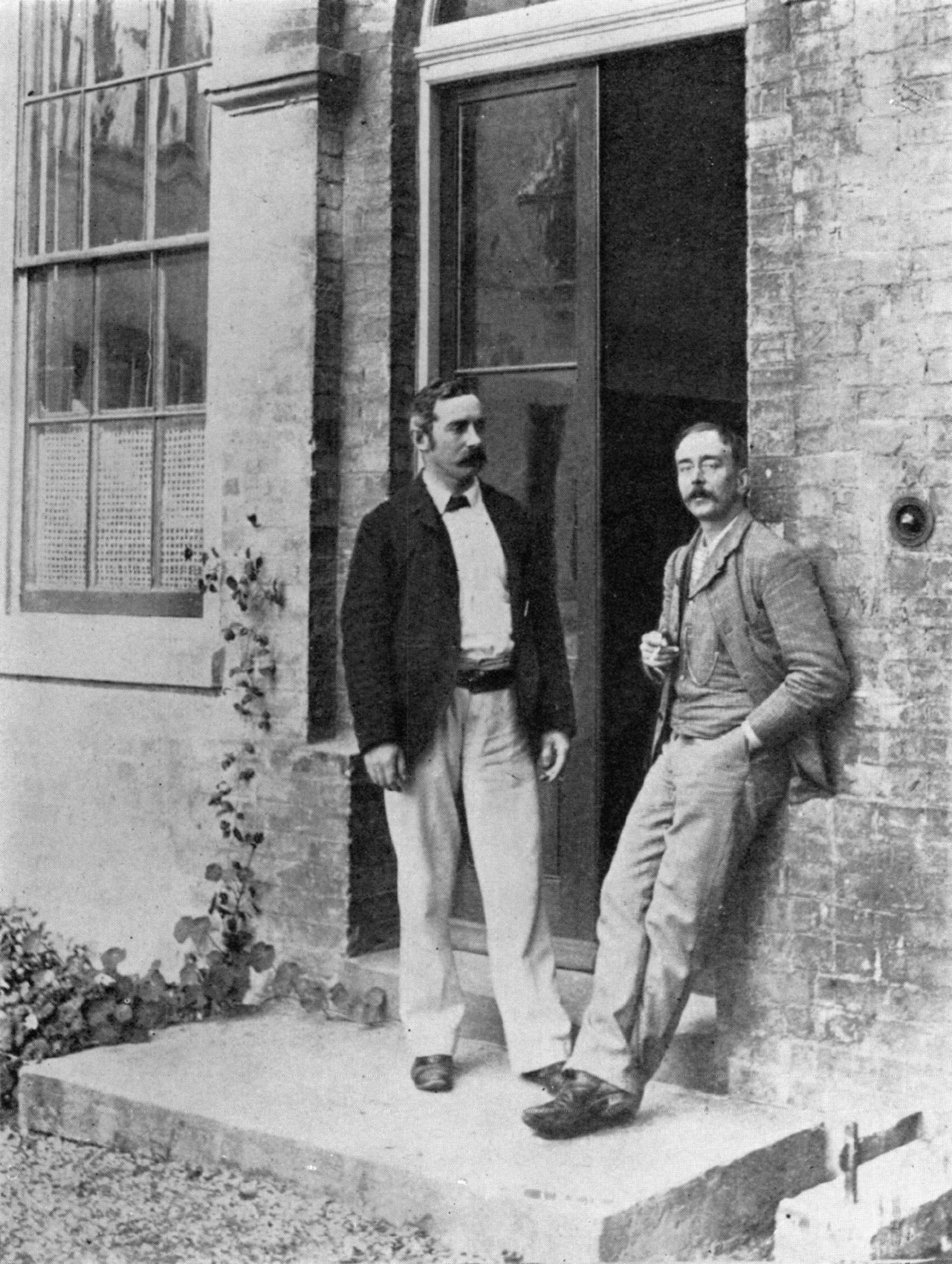
C.S. Roy and Charles Scott Sherrington (right), at the door of the Old Pathological Laboratory, Cambridge, 1893

In 1891, Sherrington was appointed as superintendent of the Brown Institute for Advanced Physiological and Pathological Research of the University of London, a center for human and animal physiological and pathological research. Sherrington succeeded Sir Victor Alexander Haden Horsley. There, Sherrington worked on segmental distribution of the spinal dorsal and ventral roots, he mapped the sensory dermatomes, and in 1892 discovered that muscle spindles initiated the stretch reflex. The institute allowed Sherrington to study many animals, both small and large. The Brown Institute had enough space to work with large primates such as apes.

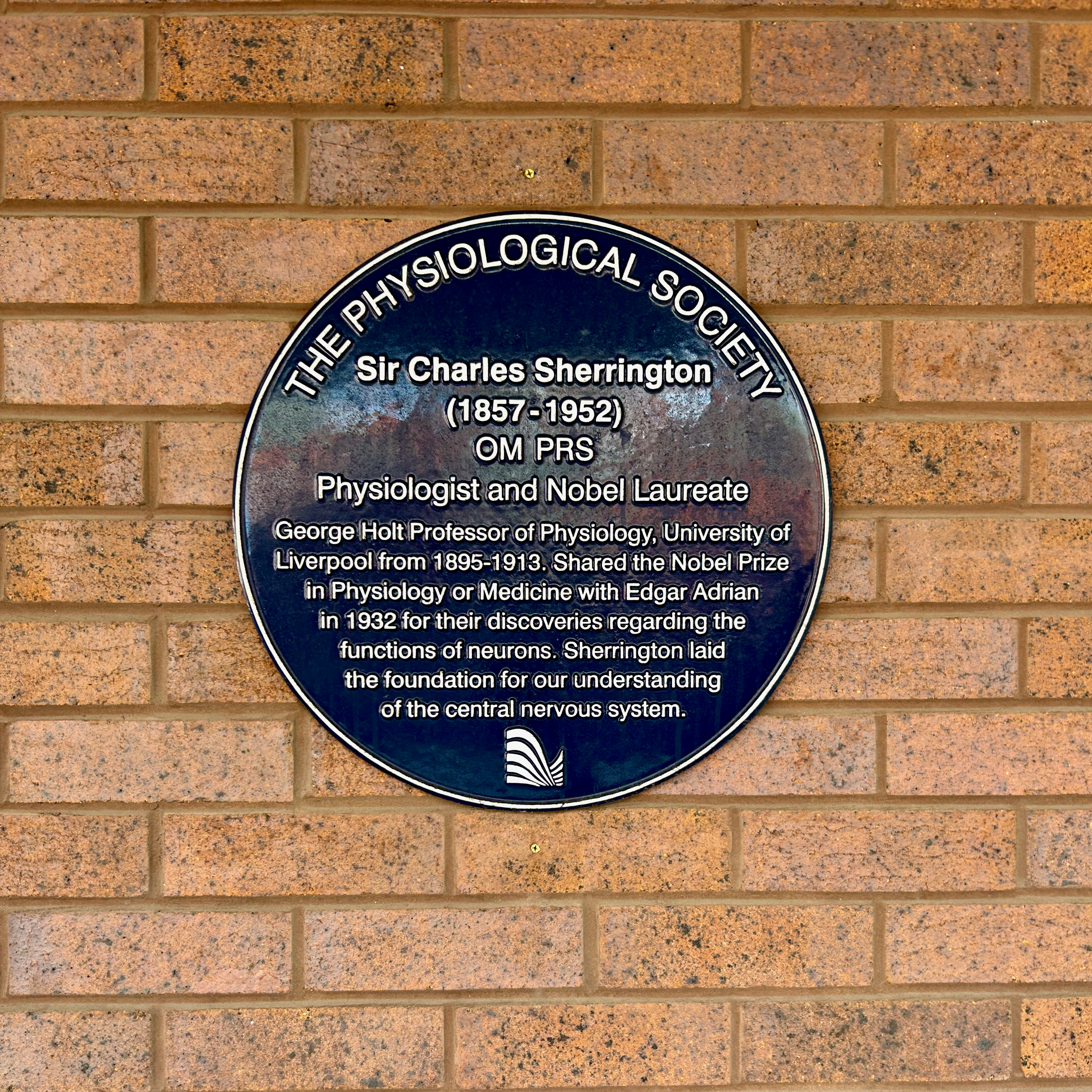
Plaque dedicated to Sherrington at the University of Liverpool

Sherrington's first job of full professorship came with his appointment as Holt Professor of Physiology at Liverpool in 1895, succeeding Francis Gotch. With his appointment to the Holt Chair, Sherrington ended his active work in pathology. Working on cats, dogs, monkeys, and apes that had been bereaved of their cerebral hemispheres, he found that reflexes must be considered integrated activities of the total organism, not just the result of activities of the so-called reflex-arcs, a concept then generally accepted. There he continued his work on reflexes and reciprocal innervation. His papers on the subject were synthesized into the Croonian lecture of 1897.

Sherrington showed that muscle excitation was inversely proportional to the inhibition of an opposing group of muscles. Speaking of the excitation-inhibition relationship, Sherrington said: "desistence from action may be as truly active as is the taking of action." Sherrington continued his work on reciprocal innervation during his years at Liverpool. Come 1913, Sherrington was able to say that "the process of excitation and inhibition may be viewed as polar opposites [...] the one is able to neutralize the other." Sherrington's work on reciprocal innervation was a notable contribution to the knowledge of the spinal cord.

As early as 1895, Sherrington had tried to gain employment at Oxford University. By 1913, the wait was over. Oxford offered Sherrington the Waynflete Chair of Physiology at Magdalen College. The electors to that chair unanimously recommended Sherrington without considering any other candidates. Sherrington enjoyed the honor of teaching many bright students at Oxford, including Wilder Penfield, who he introduced to the study of the brain. Several of his students were Rhodes scholars, three of whom – Sir John Eccles, Ragnar Granit, and Howard Florey – went on to be Nobel laureates. Sherrington also influenced American pioneer brain surgeon Harvey Williams Cushing.

Sherrington's philosophy as a teacher can be seen in his response to the question of what was the real function of Oxford University in the world. Sherrington said:

"After some hundreds of years of experience we think that we have learned here in Oxford how to teach what is known. But now with the undeniable upsurge of scientific research, we cannot continue to rely on the mere fact that we have learned how to teach what is known. We must learn to teach the best attitude to what is not yet known. This also may take centuries to acquire, but we cannot escape this new challenge, nor do we want to."

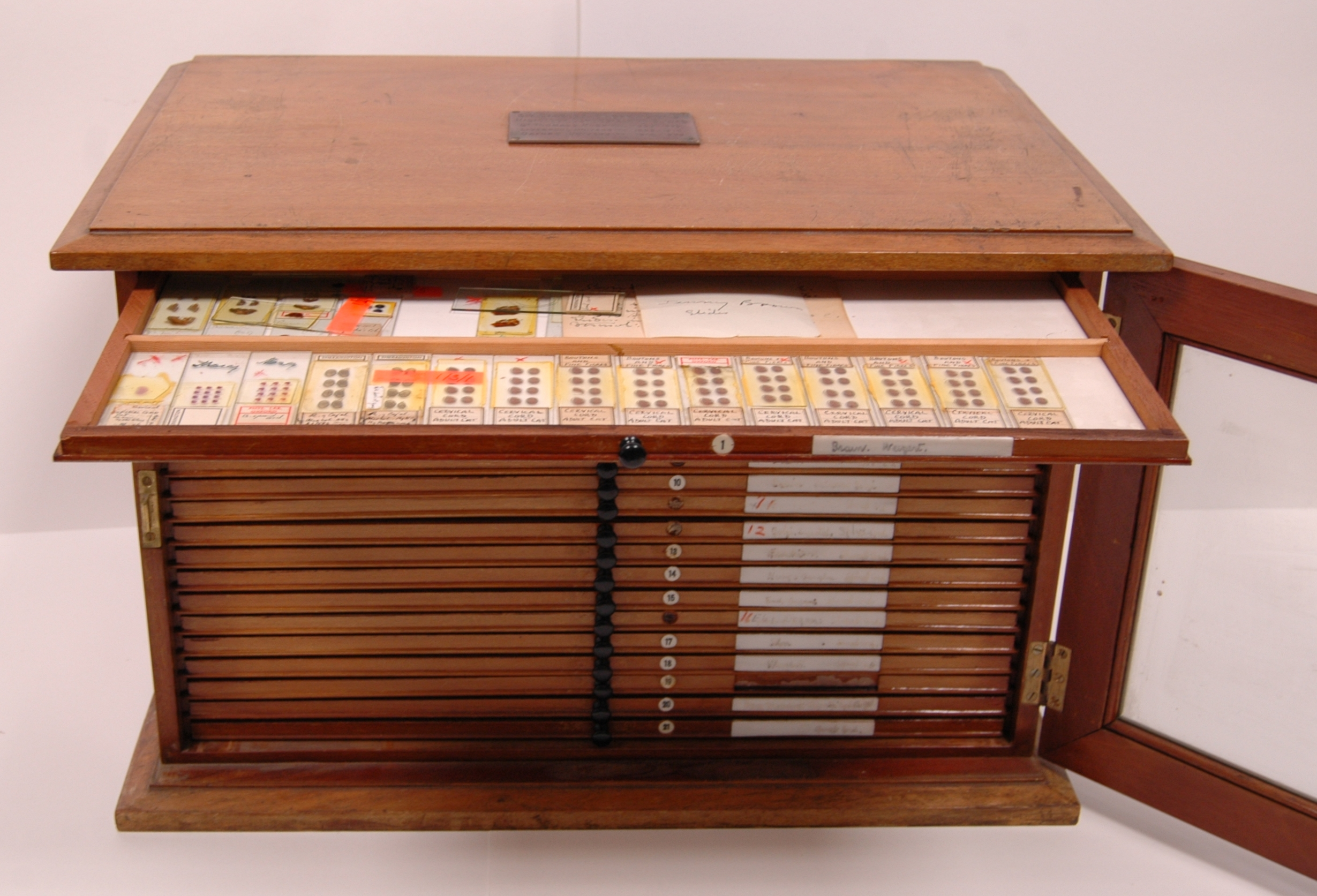
Box of microscope slides carrying the plaque: "Sir Charles Sherrington's Histology Demonstration Slides: St Thomas's Hospital: 1886–1895; Liverpool University: 1895–1915; Oxford University: 1914–1935"

While at Oxford, Sherrington kept hundreds of microscope slides in a specially constructed box labelled "Sir Charles Sherrington's Histology Demonstration Slides". As well as histology demonstration slides, the box contains slides which may be related to original breakthroughs such as cortical localization in the brain; slides from contemporaries such as Angelo Ruffini and Gustav Fritsch; and slides from colleagues at Oxford such as John Burdon-Sanderson – the first Waynflete Chair of Physiology – and Derek Denny-Brown, who worked with Sherrington at Oxford (1924–1928).

Sherrington's teachings at Oxford were interrupted by World War I. When the war started, it left his classes with only nine students. During the war, he laboured at a shell factory to support the war and to study fatigue in general, but specifically industrial fatigue. His weekday work hours were from 7:30 am to 8:30 pm, and from 7:30 am to 6:00 pm on the weekends.

In March 1916, Sherrington fought for women to be admitted to the medical school at Oxford. He retired from Oxford in the year of 1936.

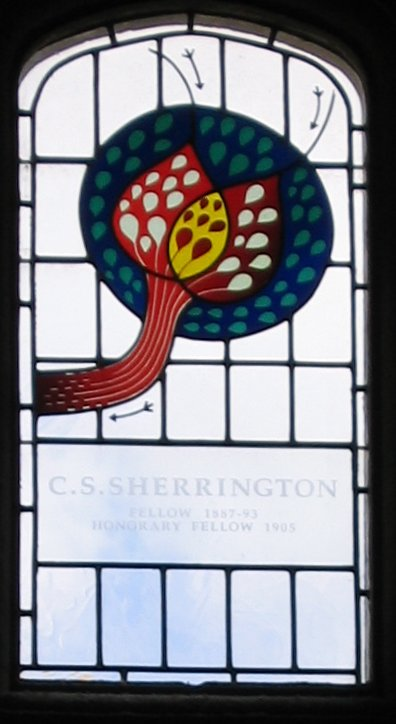
Stained glass window in the dining hall of Gonville and Caius College in Cambridge, commemorating Sherrington

== Honours and awards ==
Sherrington was elected a Fellow of the Royal Society (FRS) in 1893.

- 1899 Baly Gold Medal of the Royal College of Physicians of London
- 1905 Royal Medal of the Royal Society of London
- 1922 Knight Grand Cross of the Most Excellent Order of the British Empire (GBE)
- 1922 President of the British Association for the year 1922–1923
- 1924 Order of Merit
- 1927 Copley Medal
- 1932 Nobel Prize for Physiology or Medicine

At the time of his death Sherrington received honoris causa Doctors from twenty-two universities: Oxford, Paris, Manchester, Strasbourg, Louvain, Uppsala, Lyon, Budapest, Athens, London, Toronto, Harvard, Dublin, Edinburgh, Montreal, Liverpool, Brussels, Sheffield, Bern, Birmingham, Glasgow, and the University of Wales.

On 28 April 2022, an Oxfordshire blue plaque in his honour was unveiled at his former house in Oxford.

== Personal life ==
On 27 August 1891, Sherrington married Ethel Mary Wright (died 1933), daughter of John Ely Wright of Preston Manor, Suffolk, England. They had one child, a son named Charles ("Carr") E.R. Sherrington, who was born in 1897. They lived at 9 Chadlington Road in north Oxford. On weekends during the Oxford years, the couple would frequently host a large group of friends and acquaintances at their house for an enjoyable afternoon. Ethel died in 1933.

After retiring, Sherrington moved to his boyhood town of Ipswich, where he built a house. There, he kept up a large correspondence with pupils and others from around the world. He also continued to work on his poetic, historical, and philosophical interests. From 1944 until his death, he was president of the Ipswich Museum, on the committee he had previously served.

Sherrington's mental faculties were crystal clear up to the time of his sudden death on 4 March 1952, which was caused by a sudden heart failure at age 94. His bodily health, however, did suffer in old age. Arthritis was a major burden. Speaking of his condition, Sherrington said, "old age isn't pleasant[,] one can't do things for oneself." The arthritis put Sherrington in a nursing home in the year before his death, in 1951.

== Select publications ==
=== The Integrative Action of the Nervous System ===
Published in 1906, this was a compendium of ten of Sherrington's Silliman lectures, delivered at Yale University in 1904.

The book discussed neuron theory, the "synapse" (a term he had introduced in 1897, the word itself suggested by classicist A. W. Verrall), communication between neurons, and a mechanism for the reflex-arc function. The work effectively resolved the debate between neuron and reticular theory in mammals, thereby shaping our understanding of the central nervous system.

He theorized that the nervous system coordinates various parts of the body and that reflexes were the simplest expressions of the interactive action of the nervous system, enabling the entire body to function toward a definite purpose. Sherrington pointed out that reflexes must be goal-directive and purposive. Furthermore, he established the nature of postural reflexes and their dependence on the anti-gravity stretch reflex and traced the afferent stimulus to the proprioceptive end organs, which he had previously shown to be sensory in nature ("proprioceptive" was another term he had coined). The work was dedicated to Ferrier.

=== Mammalian Physiology: a Course of Practical Exercises ===
The textbook was published in 1919 at the first possible moment after Sherrington arrived at Oxford and the end of the War.

=== The Assaying of Brabantius and other Verse ===
This collection of previously published war-time poems was Sherrington's first major poetic release, published in 1925. Sherrington's poetic side was inspired by Johann Wolfgang von Goethe. Sherrington was fond of Goethe the poet, but not Goethe the scientist. Speaking of Goethe's scientific writings, Sherrington said: "to appraise them is not a congenial task."

=== Man on His Nature ===
A reflection on Sherrington's philosophical thought. Sherrington had long studied the 16th-century French physician Jean Fernel, and grew so familiar with him that he considered him a friend. During the academic year 1937-38, Sherrington delivered the Gifford lectures at the University of Edinburgh. They focused on Fernel and his times, and formed the basis of Man on His Nature. The book was published in 1940, with a revised edition in 1951. It explores philosophical thoughts about the mind, human existence, and God, in accordance with natural theology. In the original edition, each of the twelve chapters begins with one of the twelve zodiac signs; Sherrington discusses astrology in Fernel's time in Chapter 2. In his ideas on mind and cognition, Sherrington introduced the idea that neurons work as groups in a "million-fold democracy" to produce outcomes rather than with central control.

== See also ==
- List of presidents of the Royal Society

Professional and academic associations
Preceded by J. J. Thomson	43rd President of the Royal Society; 1920–1925	Succeeded by Ernest Rutherford
