= Emanuel Edward Klein =

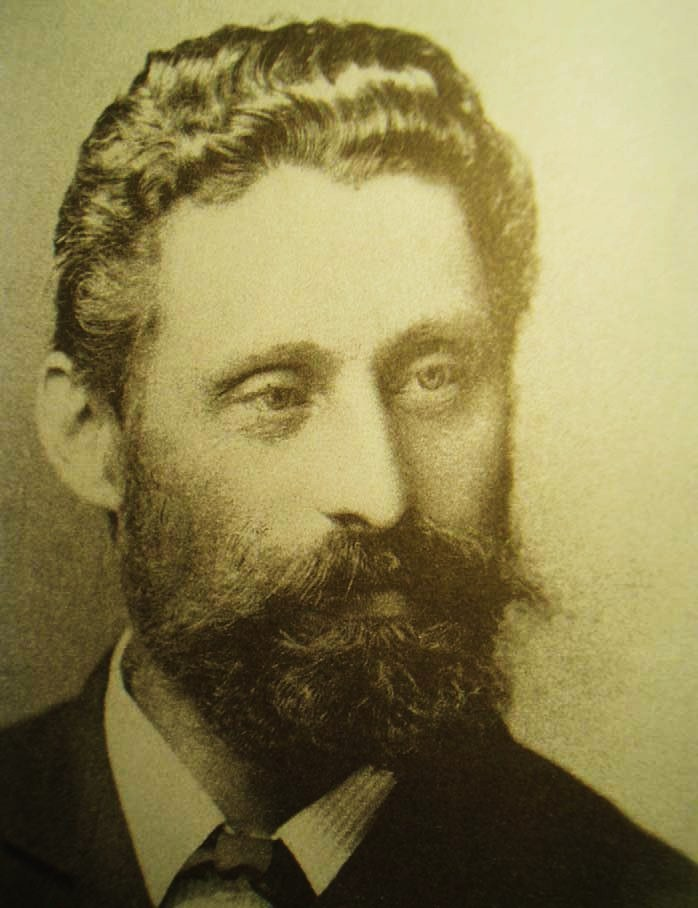
Portrait from Saint Bartholomew's Hospital archives

Emanuel Edward Klein FRS (31 October 1844 at Osijek – 9 February 1925 at Hove) was a bacteriologist who was born in Croatia and educated in Austria before settling in Britain. He is sometimes known as the father of British microbiology, but most of his work in microbiology, histology, and bacteriology was overshadowed during his life by his use of and apparently outspoken support for animal vivisection in physiological and medical experiments. His English was poor and during court questioning, many of the answers he provided were considered shocking.

== Life and work ==
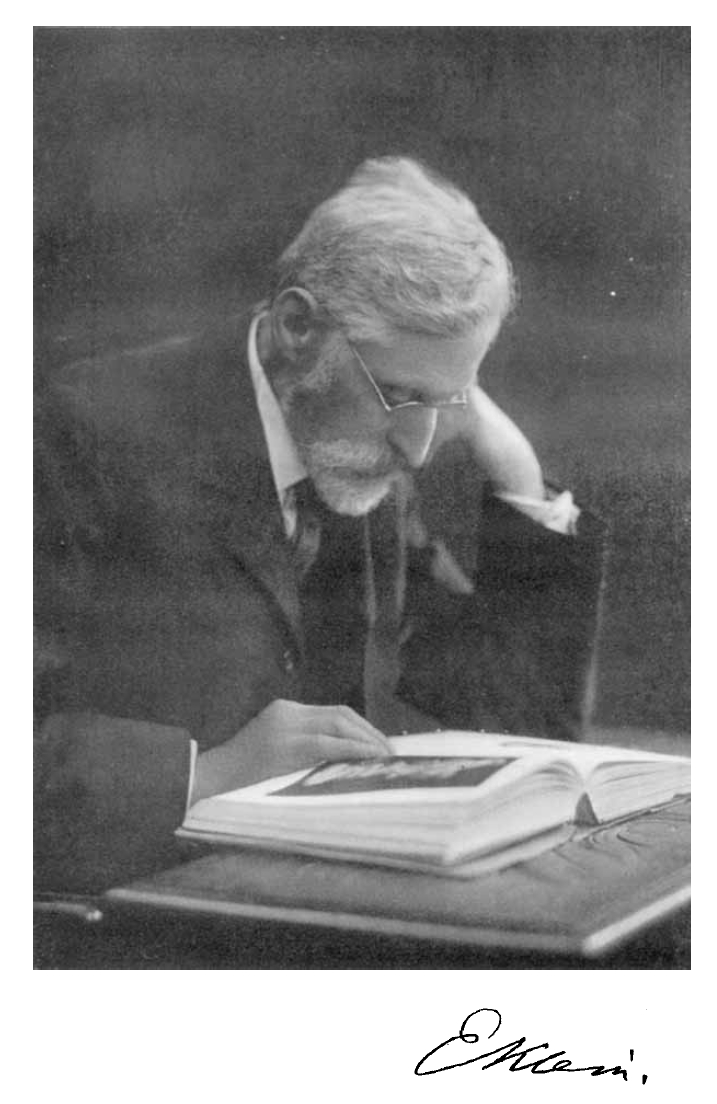
Klein c. 1910

Klein was born on 31 October 1844 at Osijek in a German speaking non-practicing Jewish home. His father, who died when he was about fourteen, was a tanner working for a Russian leather company. After graduating in the local school he became a tutor in the classics and at eighteen he worked in London to help his family. He later went to study medicine at Vienna and obtained an M.D. in 1869. At Vienna he worked with Ernst Wilhelm Brücke. In 1871 he visited England to help in the translation of a German work Handbuch der Lehre von den Geweben des Menschen und der Thiere by his Viennese teachers Salomon Stricker (1834-1898). The hosts, John Burdon Sanderson and John Simon were impressed by his knowledge and they invited Klein to work in London in 1871. Klein moved to the Brown Animal Sanatory Institution and in 1873, became a professor of comparative pathology. He also worked at Saint Bartholomew's Hospital where he was made a joint professor of general anatomy and physiology. His work on animal physiology was published in Handbook for the Physiological Laboratory in 1873, along with Burdon Sanderson, Thomas Lauder Brunton and Michael Foster and they made use of experimental methods on living animals, something that were considered acceptable in the Vienna Medical School. The anti-vivisection movement protested the methods described in their textbook and in 1875, after he was elected Fellow of the Royal Society, the Royal Commission on Vivisection for Scientific Purposes held its hearings and although Foster, Brunton and Burdon Sanderson were careful in responding to the queries, Klein responded without any apparent remorse although some biographers attribute it to his limited knowledge of English. Klein tried to provide a revised text of his responses but the Royal Commission rejected this. Klein was made into a monster by the media, and he became the main target of the anti-vivisectionists and the case led to the establishment of the Cruelty to Animals Act 1876. Klein worked at the Brown Institution from 1871 to 1897 during which time he also mentored students who included Francis Darwin, Jeremiah MacCarthy, James Adams and Frederick Treves.

The media coverage during the anti-vivisection case made Klein widely infamous. Several novels of the period were inspired by the case including Paul Faber, Surgeon (1878) by George MacDonald; The Professor's Wife (1881) by Leonard Graham and Heart and Science (1883) by Wilkie Collins. These novels included a scientist as a key character, modelled after Klein and juxtaposed with a range of negative traits and ethnic stereotypes.

Klein's training in Europe however allowed him to access the microbiological techniques developed by Louis Pasteur and Robert Koch, and he wrote the first major English work in bacteriology in 1884. In 1884, Klein, Alfred Lingard, and Heneage Gibbes were sent as part of the British cholera commission to Calcutta in India to verify the findings of Koch which had caused some embarrassment to the British Indian medical community. Klein was able to find the comma-shaped Vibrio cholerae bacteria in the water supply where Koch had found them as well as in the stools of infected patients. He however did not fully accept the idea that the same bacteria caused the disease. In 1885, he studied the outbreak of a disease of cows which was termed as scarlet fever and isolated four species of bacteria during the research, including Streptococcus pyogenes, the causal agent. Klein also worked on bacteria in food and helped in establishing methods for food processing and preservation. Of the 264 scientific publications in his career nearly 200 were in microbiology. Ronald Ross was one of Klein's students. Klein was the author of the Elements of Histology (1883).

His name was originally just Emanuel and he signed as E.Klein but during his membership with the Organon Club (founded by Ray Lankester) the secretary thought it stood for Edward. Klein was a founding member of the Medical Research Club (1891) and was a joint editor of the Quarterly Journal of Microscopical Science.

== Personal life ==
He married Sophia Mawley (died 1919) in 1877. They had a son, Bernard and two daughters. Klein was an able chess player and a musician. He died of pneumonia at his home in Hove on 9 February 1925.
