= Neuropathy (disambiguation) =

Neuropathy is a condition affecting the nerves of the peripheral nervous system.

Neuropathy may also refer to:

- Cranial neuropathy, any condition affecting cranial nerves
  - Auditory neuropathy, any condition affecting the auditory nerve
  - Optic neuropathy, any condition affecting the optic nerve (including "Leber's hereditary optic neuropathy")
- Diabetic neuropathy, peripheral neuropathy due to diabetes mellitus
- Familial amyloid neuropathies, a rare group of autosomal dominant neuropathies of autonomic (and sometimes also sensory or motor) nerves
- Giant axonal neuropathy, a rare neurological disorder that causes disorganization of neurofilaments
- Hereditary neuropathy with liability to pressure palsy (HNPP), a peripheral neuropathy that affects the sensory and muscle nerves
- Neuropathy, ataxia, and retinitis pigmentosa (NARP), a condition that causes a variety of signs and symptoms chiefly affecting the nervous system
- Neuropathy target esterase, a protein (enzyme) that catalyzes (increases the rates of) chemical reactions
- Organophosphate-induced delayed neuropathy, a neuropathy caused by killing of neurons in the central nervous system, especially in the spinal cord, as a result of acute or chronic organophosphate poisoning
- Polyneuropathy, a neurological disorder that occurs when many peripheral nerves throughout the body malfunction simultaneously

== See also ==
- Charcot–Marie–Tooth disease
- Neuropathia mucinosa cutanea
- Neuropathic arthropathy
- Neuropathic pain
- Neuropathic ulcer
- Neuropathology
- Neuropathology and Applied Neurobiology, medical journal

=== Contrasts ===
- Neuropathy contrasts with terms describing problems in other parts of the nervous system such as:
  - Encephalopathy
  - Myelopathy
  - Radiculopathy
  - Neuromuscular junction disease
  - Myopathy
