= Helena Riggs =

American neuropathologist

Helena Emma Riggs
- Born: December 18, 1899
- Died: October 7, 1968 (aged 68)
- Citizenship: American
- Education: University of Pennsylvania
- Scientific career
- Fields: Neuropathology
- Workplaces: Philadelphia General Hospital, University of Pennsylvania

Helena E. Riggs (December 18, 1899 – October 7, 1968) was an American neuropathologist at Philadelphia General Hospital and the University of Pennsylvania. In 1948, she was one of the first two neuropathologists to be certified by the American Board of Pathology, and in 1950 she served as the first woman President of the Philadelphia Neurological Society. The Diagnostic Slide Session O.T. Bailey-Helena Riggs Award is given in her honor by the American Association of Neuropathologists.

== Early life and education ==
Helena Emma Riggs born on December 18, 1899 to Robert Judson Riggs, a Philadelphia jeweler. She was educated privately and attended Bryn Mawr College for two years (1917–1919) before transferring to the University of Pennsylvania. She graduated with her Bachelor of Arts degree (A.B.) from the College of General Studies of the University of Pennsylvania as part of the class of 1921.

Riggs entered the School of Medicine of the University of Pennsylvania, receiving her M.D. in 1925. She served as an internship at the Philadelphia General Hospital, which rarely accepted women at that time. She then completed a year of graduate studies in pathology, again at the University of Pennsylvania.

== Career ==
From 1928 to 1932, Riggs worked with William McConnell, a clinical neuropathologist. After his death, she worked with Nathaniel W. Winkleman, a part-time neuropathologist at Philadelphia General Hospital. Due to her "extraordinary talent" she became the full-time head of the Neuropathology Laboratory at the Philadelphia General Hospital, the first such laboratory to be established in the United States. She held that position from 1935 to 1968. Riggs was one of the first two neuropathologists to be certified by the American Board of Pathology in 1948, along with Webb Haymaker.

Riggs taught at the University of Pennsylvania as an Instructor (1929–31), Associate Professor (1931–35, 1948–50), Assistant Professor of Pathology (1950–60), and full Professor of Neuropathology (1960–68). She was the second woman to join the standing faculty of the Graduate School of Medicine in 1950, and the first woman to earn tenure and hold a senior professorship in that school in 1960.

In the second World War, Riggs worked as a consultant for the U. S. Navy in the training of war-time neurologists. Riggs was a member of the American Association for Research in Nervous and Mental Diseases, American Neurologic Association, American Academy of Neurology, American Association of Neuropathologists, American Association for the Advancement of Science, Society of Biological Psychiatry, The College of Physicians of Philadelphia, and the Philadelphia Neurological Society. She was the first woman to serve as President of the Philadelphia Neurological Society, in 1950.

Riggs was an early member of the Neuropathology Club, founded in 1925, which became the American Association of Neuropathologists in 1930. From 1959 to 1967, Riggs served as the founding manager of The Slide Session at the annual meeting of the American Association of Neuropathologists, of which Orville Bailey was founding moderator. The group met to review difficult cases. The Diagnostic Slide Session O.T. Bailey-Helena Riggs Award is given in her honor.

Helena Riggs contributed to the description of arterial and venous anatomy through her post-mortem studies and accurate descriptions, as did Charles Rupp and Dorcas Padget. She studied neurogenic and circulatory factors relating to diseases including peptic ulcers and Wernicke's Disease. An atlas of myelinization in the infant brain, Myelination of the brain in the newborn was completed after her death by her co-author, Lucy Rorke.

The American Association of Neuropathologists authorized the installation of a plaque in the Philadelphia General Hospital. It was inscribed "To the memory of Dr. Helena Riggs, in recognition of her services to American Neuropathology." After PGH was torn down, the plaque became part of the collection of the Mutter Museum in Philadelphia.

== Personal life ==
Riggs cultivated extensive gardens at her home, was a gourmet cook, and accomplished as a seamstress, knitter and needle-worker.

Helena E. Riggs died on October 7, 1968, from a sudden and unexpected coronary while holidaying in California.
