= Lucy Balian Rorke-Adams =

American pediatric neuropathologist

- Born: 1929 (age 96–97); Saint Paul, Minnesota
- Citizenship: United States
- Education: MD, University of Minnesota Medical School (1957) BS, Medicine, University of Minnesota (1955); MA, Psychology, University of Minnesota (1952) BA, Psychology, University of Minnesota (1951)
- Scientific career
- Fields: Pediatric neuropathology
- Workplaces: Children’s Hospital of Philadelphia, Philadelphia General Hospital, University of Pennsylvania

Lucy Balian Rorke-Adams (born 1929) is an American pediatric neuropathologist who was president of the American Association of Neuropathologists in 1982. She spent 50 years at the Children's Hospital of Philadelphia (CHOP, 1965–2015). She was the first and only female president of Philadelphia General Hospital (PGH, 1973–1977) and president of the PGH medical staff (1973–1975). She also served as president of the medical staff at CHOP (1986-1988) and as acting chair of pathology at CHOP (1995–2001). She was a professor at the Perelman School of Medicine at the University of Pennsylvania beginning in 1970, becoming clinical professor of pathology as of 1979.

== Early life ==
External videos
- "SWSM Distinguished Lecture – Dr. Lucy Rourke-Adams", May 14, 2015.

She was born as Lucy Balian in Saint Paul, Minnesota, in 1929. She was the fifth and last daughter of Armenian immigrants born in Turkey. Her father left Turkey for Minneapolis, Minnesota, in 1913 on the advice of a German engineer who warned him that the Turkish government planned on exterminating the Armenians. Her mother's father was killed in the Armenian genocide, and she and her mother and four siblings were driven from their home and separated following this event. Her mother and three of her siblings survived and reconnected, and were able to emigrate to the United States in 1921 with tickets from her fiancée in Minneapolis, who she had never met, having been introduced through a friend by correspondence. The two were married on April 2, 1921, and their marriage lasted 54 years.

The Balian family resided in a rural part of St. Paul, and Lucy grew up surrounded by family: a total of eight of her cousins lived close to her home, and they spent ample time together as children. Her first language was Armenian, and she entered kindergarten not being able to speak English. On top of not knowing the language, she had to walk three miles to grade school each day, and this distance increased to five miles once she reached high school.

Since there was not a large enough Armenian population in the Minneapolis–St. Paul area for an Armenian Orthodox Church to be established, the Balian family attended a local Baptist Church during Lucy's childhood. Her and her sisters were very involved in their church community as children: they attended weekly Sunday school, bible classes, sang in the choir, and participated in youth fellowship programs.

As a teenager, Lucy's dream was to be an opera singer. She eventually earned an audition with Gladys Swarthout, one of the major stars of the Metropolitan Opera Company at the time, but her audition was cancelled two days before it was scheduled to occur. She was so devastated that she gave up pursuing a career in music entirely and turned her focus to medicine.

== Education ==
Lucy Balian entered the University of Minnesota as an undergraduate psychology major in 1947. In the summer between her junior and senior undergraduate year, she spent time pursuing a research endeavor at the University of Innsbruck in Austria during which she learned German, which came in handy during her career. She earned her BA in psychology in 1951, and continued her education in psychology at Minnesota, going on to earn a master's degree in the subject in 1952.

Balian relied on work to earn enough money to fund her education. As an undergraduate and graduate, to pay her tuition, she served as "girl friday" for a surgical supply salesman. After receiving her master's degree in psychology, she worked evenings in a psychology clinic doing psychological testing for the first two years of medical school. For her final two years of medical school, she worked a research job in University of Minnesota's department of psychiatry. Starting in her second year of medical school, she also had an externship at a local Minneapolis hospital.

In 1952, Balian entered medical school at the University of Minnesota. She was one of five women in her class of 110 people, and all her professors were male. She entered medical school with the goal of becoming a psychiatrist, but her focus soon shifted to neurosurgery. During an interview with the chief of neurosurgery, she was told that pursuing such a field as a woman would be pointless because neurosurgery is a referral type of specialty and nobody would refer any cases to a woman. However, this did not deter her.

=== Degrees ===
- Bachelor of Arts in psychology, 1951, College of Liberal Arts, University of Minnesota
- Master of Arts in psychology, 1952, College of Liberal Arts, University of Minnesota
- Bachelor of Science in medicine, 1955, University of Minnesota Medical School
- Doctor of Medicine, 1957, Medical School, University of Minnesota

== Career ==
Balian started her medical internship in 1957 when she was offered a highly coveted general rotating internship by Philadelphia General Hospital (PGH) on her match day. She was one of ten women out of 108 interns accepted that year. In the rotating system of this internship, she spent a month in each rotation. Her first rotation was neurosurgery, followed by psychiatry, then pediatrics, anesthesia, obstetrics, tuberculosis service, surgery, gynecology, medicine, orthopedics, the diabetic ward, then finally outpatient. During her pediatric rotation, one of the eight interns working with her developed pneumonia secondary to an infection and died. During her internship year, she and the other interns earned only fifty-seven dollars a month (around $1.90 per day), which was one dollar more than the monthly income that would qualify a Philadelphian to apply for relief. Although she began her internship hoping to end up in a neurosurgery residency, she ended up applying for a residency in pathology, because she realized she did not function well without sleep and acknowledged that if she became a surgical resident, a lack of sleep would be a given.

During her pathology residency, Balian was under the guidance of William Ehrich, the chief of pathology at PGH at the time. On her first day as a resident, Ehrich told her that as she was the only woman in her residency class and since "pediatrics is the province of ladies", she would be responsible for performing all of the pediatric autopsies. However, this responsibility ended up sparking her interest for the field of pediatrics. During her time as a resident, she chose to specialize in neuropathology, and she began working under the guidance of Helena Riggs, who was a pioneer in the field at the time. (After her marriage in 1960, her surname became Rorke and her maiden name was styled as her middle name, so her name became Lucy Balian Rorke at that point for most of her career.)

After completing her residency, she was invited to stay at PGH in a dual role: Chief of Pediatric Pathology and Assistant Neuropathologist, a role that offered her the chance to spend more time working with Riggs. With funds from the NIH, the pair began a study on the myelination of the nervous system from the stage of viability to term. They investigated the development of myelin in 107 fetuses over a five-year period, culminating in the publishing of the atlas Myelination of the brain in the newborn in 1970. Riggs died shortly after the book was written, without knowing it had been accepted for publication, and Rorke assumed responsibility of neuropathology at PGH in 1968. In 1969, she became chairman of the department of pathology until the hospital closed in 1977. She also served as the first (and only) female president of the medical staff from 1973 until the hospital's closure.

Rorke began working part-time at the Children's Hospital of Philadelphia (CHOP), the nation's first hospital devoted to the care of children, in 1965. In the mid-1970s, after several years of holding a part-time position at CHOP, she became co-investigator on a massive study of pediatric brain tumors, where she looked at 3300 brain tumors over a four-year period. Based on her findings during this study, Rorke proposed reclassifications of embryonic pediatric brain tumors in a her presidential address to the American Association of Neuropathologists, which led to improved treatment and outcomes for patients.

In 1972, the office of the medical examiner for the city of Philadelphia moved their location to PGH, bringing Rorke into close contact with forensic pathology for the first time. Following the closure of Philadelphia General Hospital, she began to work eight hours per day (full-time) at CHOP as a pediatric neuropathologist and four hours per day at the office of the medical examiner.

In 1986, Rorke became president of the medical staff at CHOP. Shortly after her appointment, she played a key role in helping run the hospital during an extended search for a CEO. She also went on to become the acting chair of pathology from 1995 to 2001.

During her time at CHOP, Rorke was the author of pioneering studies on the infant brain's normal and abnormal development, the effects of inadequate oxygenation during the perinatal period, and various nervous disorders unique to children. She also became an expert on shaken baby syndrome. She has been a key expert evaluating cases in which children were mistakenly suspected of being harmed by vaccines. In the 1990s, she presented a hypothesis on the origin of brain malformations arising in early human development: she proposed that disordered genetic control allows neurons to migrate to abnormal, disease-causing locations.

Rorke-Adams retired on June 19, 2015, after a 50-year long career at Children's Hospital of Philadelphia. Throughout her career, she has published over 300 peer-reviewed papers, multiple chapters in textbooks, and two books. She has served on the editorial board of the Journal of Neuropathy and Experimental Neurology, Brain Pathology, and Pediatric Neuroscience. In 2015, she joined the Knowles Board of Trustees.

Rorke-Adams has been instrumental in donating significant artifacts to museum collections. As Chief of Pathology at Children's Hospital of Philadelphia, Rorke-Adams was instrumental in preserving the contents of the Blockley "Dead House" of Philadelphia General Hospital (PGH). The original small brick building was used by Sir William Osler for autopsies. When it was torn down, Riggs had the contents moved to the Pathology building. When PGH closed in 1977, Riggs donated the Osler collection, including the autopsy table, instruments and records, to the College of Physicians of Philadelphia. The autopsy table is listed in the collections of the Mutter Museum.

Rorke-Adams had also obtained a set of 23 pairs of slides from the brain of Albert Einstein in the 1970s, and donated them to the Mutter Museum in November 2011. Thomas Stoltz Harvey, who autopsied Einstein, had retained his brain without permission of the family, believing it should be studied. (Harvey was later fired from his position for retaining the brain and Einstein's eyes.) Five sets of slides were later created by Marta Keller under the supervision of William Ehrich at PGH. Ehrich kept one set, which eventually came into her possession.

=== Awards and accolades ===
- 2023, honorary Doctor of Letters degree and commencement address speaker, Rowan University
- 2017, Outstanding Achievement Award, University of Minnesota Medical School
- 2010, named faculty chair in pediatric neuropathology created in her honor by Children's Hospital of Philadelphia (CHOP)
- 2008, Richard D. Wood Distinguished Alumni Award, Children's Hospital of Philadelphia
- 2003, Provost's Award, University of Pennsylvania
- 1999, Award for Meritorious Contributions to Neuropathology, American Association of Neuropathologists
- 1982, President, American Association of Neuropathologists
- 1971, Fellow of the College of Physicians of Philadelphia

== Personal life ==
Lucy Balian married Robert Rorke on June 4, 1960. Rorke died in 2002, after the two had been married for nearly 42 years. In 2004, Lucy Balian Rorke married Boyce Adams, who had been a close friend of hers for many years. Adams died of metastatic cancer two years and two months after they were married, leaving Rorke-Adams widowed for the second time.
