= AANP =

AANP may refer to:

- American Association of Neuropathologists, a professional association for neuropathologists
- American Association of Nurse Practitioners, a professional association for nurse practitioners
