= Rawhide (1938 film) =

1938 film by Ray Taylor

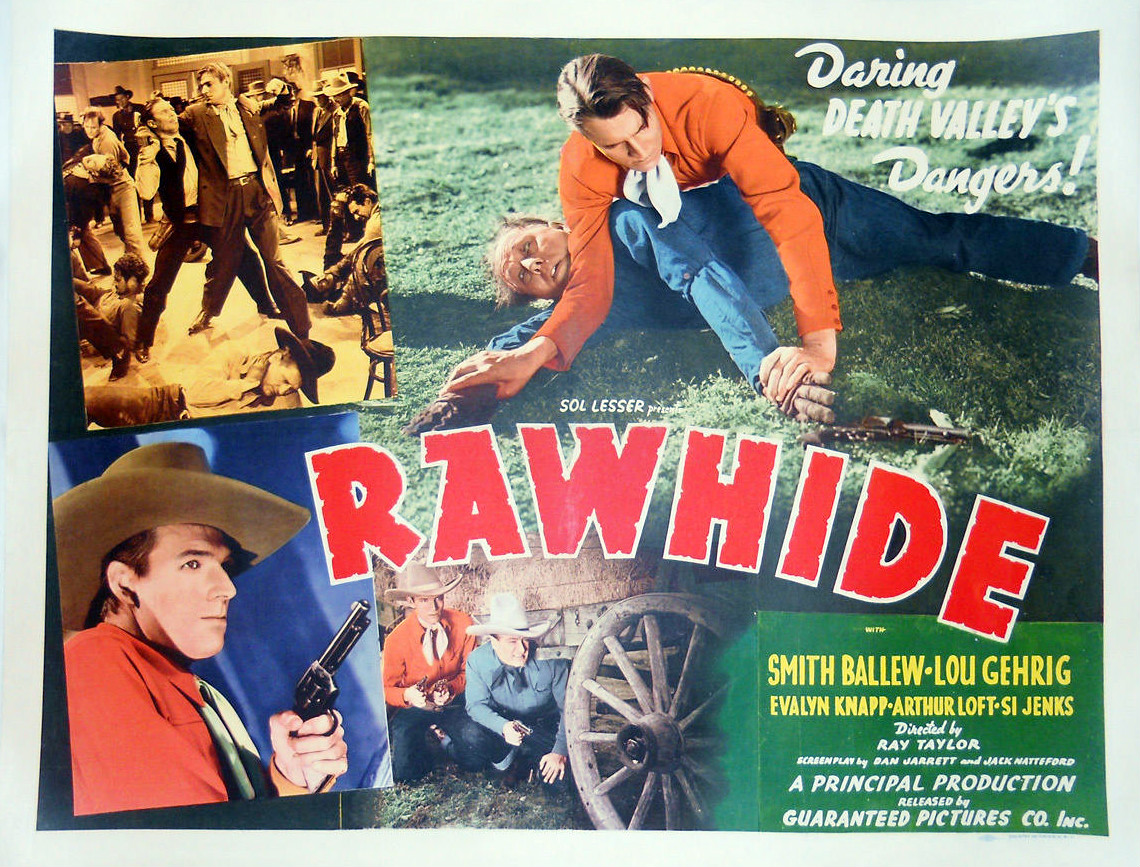
- Theatrical release poster
- Directed by: Ray Taylor
- Written by: Jack Natteford; Daniel Jarrett
- Produced by: Sol Lesser
- Starring: Lou Gehrig; Smith Ballew; Evalyn Knapp
- Cinematography: Allen Q. Thompson
- Edited by: Robert O. Crandall
- Music by: Michael Breen
- Distributed by: 20th Century-Fox
- Release date: April 8, 1938
- Running time: 58 minutes
- Country: United States
- Language: English
- Budget: $100,000

Rawhide is a 1938 American Western film starring Lou Gehrig and released by 20th Century-Fox. It was directed by Ray Taylor and produced by Sol Lesser from a screenplay by Jack Natteford and Daniel Jarrett. The cinematography was by Allen Q. Thompson. This is the only Hollywood movie in which baseball great Lou Gehrig made a screen appearance, playing himself as a vacationing ballplayer visiting his sister Peggy (played by Evalyn Knapp) on a ranch in the fictional town of Rawhide, Montana. The film remains available on DVD and VHS formats.

== Plot ==
The full film

The storyline revolves around Lou Gehrig playing himself, who decides to give up baseball in New York for the life of a western cattle rancher. Once at the ranch, Gehrig encounters a protection racket preying on the ranchers by extortion and violence. He teams up with a crusading local attorney to fight the crooks and ultimately put them in jail.

In the opening scene, Lou Gehrig is surrounded by a group of reporters at Grand Central Terminal in New York City, where he is about to take a train to his sister's ranch out west in Rawhide. Proclaiming that he is "through with baseball", he tells the sceptical newsmen that he wants the "peace and quiet" of the cowboy life.

Gehrig plays an easygoing dude rancher, whose self-deprecating humor is displayed the first time he attempts to ride a horse. As he timidly approaches his steed, a ranch hand urges, "Jus' walk right up to him like ya' wasn't afraid", to which Gehrig deadpans, "I couldn't be that deceitful".

An unscrupulous interloper, Ed Saunders, and his henchmen have seized control of the local "Ranchers Protective Association" by subterfuge and are using it as a front to extort outrageous "association fees" from the local ranchers, resorting to violence and bribery. After Gehrig refuses to pay, one of his ranch hands is shot by one of the crooks. Gehrig storms into the local saloon to confront Saunders and his gang. When a barroom brawl ensues, the attorney (played by co-star Smith Ballew) joins in the fight as Gehrig hurls billiard balls at the criminals. The movie eventually reaches a climax in the obligatory Western film chase scene when Gehrig and the other ranchers form a posse to chase the fleeing Saunders gang and put them in jail.

The film has several musical interludes. Ballew sings When a Cowboy Goes to Town by Albert von Tilzer (who also composed the familiar Take Me Out to the Ball Game). Other songs credited are Cowboy's Life by Charles Rosoff, Drifting also by von Tilzer, and That Old Washboard Band by Norman Phelps.

== Production ==
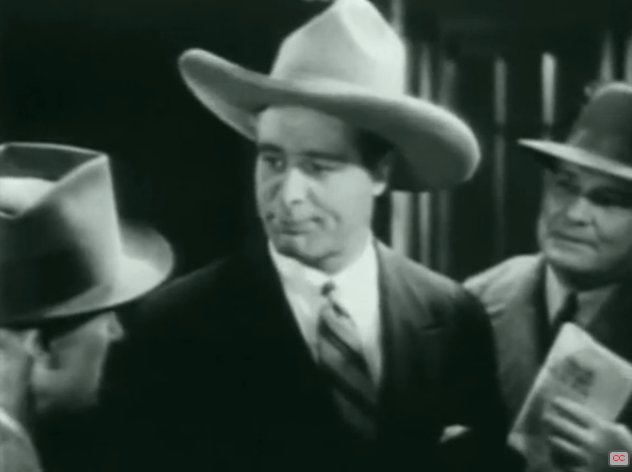
Gehrig in film with white hat

Filming took place in January 1938 during the baseball off-season. Other actors in the film are Arthur Loft, who plays the villain Ed Saunders, Dick Curtis, his henchman, and Cy Kendall, the corrupt sheriff.

Rawhide premiered in March 1938 in St. Petersburg, Florida, while the New York Yankees were in town for their annual spring training at Al Lang Field. The occasion was celebrated by a gala parade complete with local marching bands and fireworks. Led by the Florida resort town's mayor and baseball booster, Al Lang (in whose honor the stadium would later be renamed), other parade participants included Yankees owner Jacob Ruppert, Yankees manager Joe McCarthy, and Frankie Frisch, manager of the St. Louis Cardinals (who also trained in St. Petersburg at the time). The New York Times informed readers that when the parade reached the theater's lobby, "Two-Gun Lou, spurs and all, will be on the receiving line to shake the hands of distinguished guests". The film was released in general distribution to movie theaters on April 8, 1938. Later, the New York City-born Gehrig would joke that it was the first time he had ever been on a horse.

== Subsequent research ==
Researchers presented a paper to the American Academy of Neurology in 2006, reporting on an analysis of Rawhide and photographs of Lou Gehrig from the 1937–39 period, to ascertain when Gehrig began to show visible symptoms of amyotrophic lateral sclerosis, the disease that would force his retirement from baseball in 1939 and eventually claim his life in 1941. They concluded that while atrophy of hand muscles could be detected in 1939 photographs of Gehrig, no such abnormality was visible at the time the movie was made. "Examination of Rawhide showed that Gehrig functioned normally in January 1938", the report concluded.

== See also ==
- Pride of the Yankees
