= Lou Gehrig =

American baseball player (1903–1941)

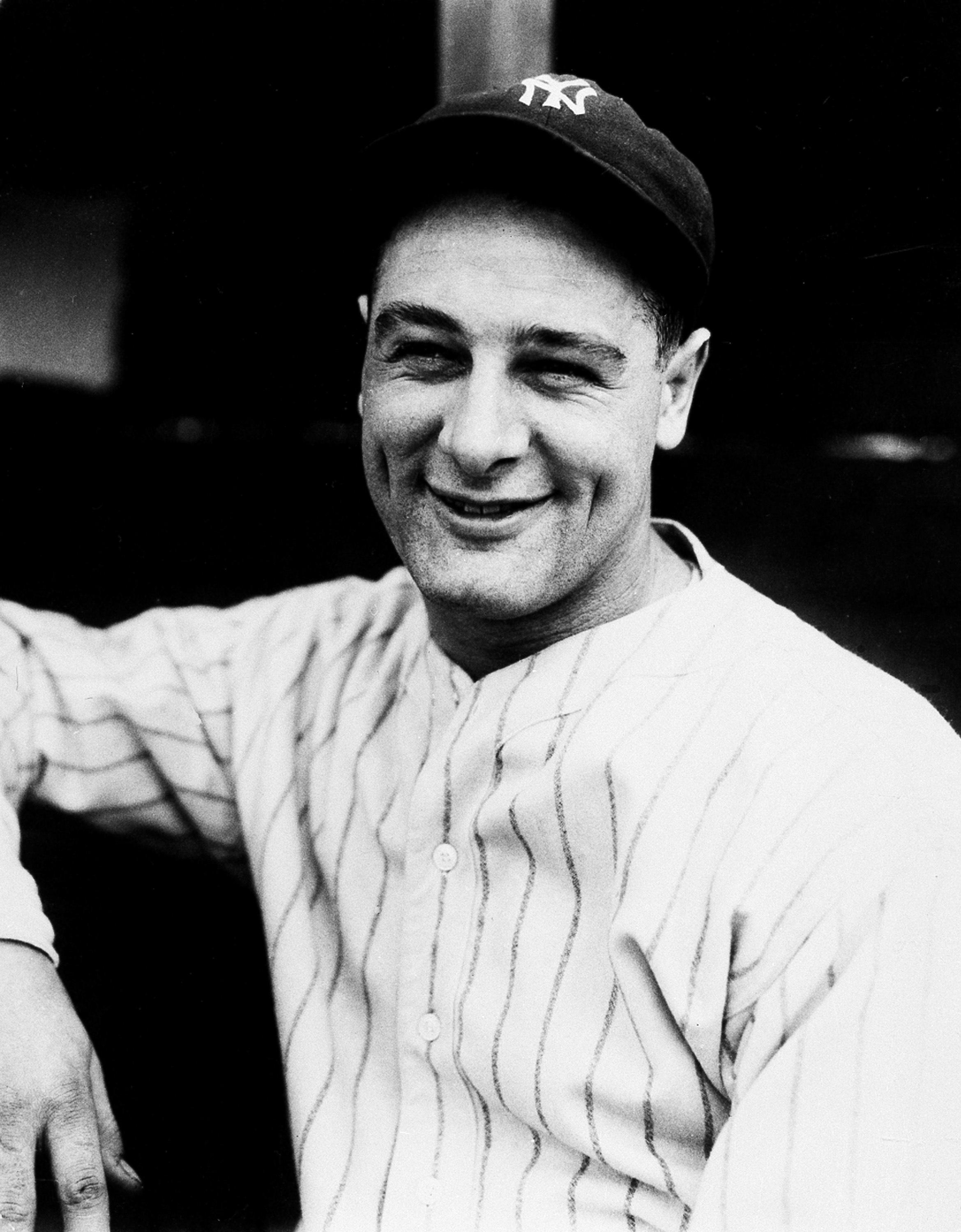
- Gehrig with the New York Yankees in 1923
- First baseman
- Born: June 19, 1903; Manhattan, New York, U.S.
- Died: June 2, 1941 (aged 37); The Bronx, New York, U.S.
- Batted: Left Threw: Left

MLB debut
- June 15, 1923, for the New York Yankees

Last MLB appearance
- April 30, 1939, for the New York Yankees

MLB statistics
- Batting average: .340
- Hits: 2,721
- Home runs: 493
- Runs batted in: 1,995
- Stats at Baseball Reference

Teams
- New York Yankees (1923–1939)

Career highlights and awards
- 7× All-Star (1933–1939); 6× World Series champion (1927, 1928, 1932, 1936–1938); 2× AL MVP (1927, 1936); Triple Crown (1934); AL batting champion (1934); 3× AL home run leader (1931, 1934, 1936); 5× AL RBI leader (1927, 1928, 1930, 1931, 1934); Hit four home runs in one game on June 3, 1932; New York Yankees No. 4 retired; Monument Park honoree; Major League Baseball All-Century Team; Major League Baseball All-Time Team

Member of the National

Baseball Hall of Fame
- Induction: 1939
- Election method: Special Election

Henry Louis Gehrig (/ˈɡɛərɪɡ/ GAIR-ig; born Heinrich Ludwig Gehrig; June 19, 1903 – June 2, 1941) was an American professional baseball first baseman who played 17 seasons in Major League Baseball (MLB) for the New York Yankees. Gehrig was renowned for his prowess as a hitter and for his durability, which earned him the nickname "the Iron Horse", and he is regarded as one of the greatest baseball players of all time. Gehrig was an All-Star seven consecutive times, a Triple Crown winner once, an American League (AL) Most Valuable Player twice and a member of six World Series champion teams. He had a career .340 batting average, .632 slugging average, and a .447 on-base average. He hit 493 home runs and had 1,995 runs batted in (RBIs). He is also one of 21 players to hit four home runs in a single game. In 1939, Gehrig was elected to the Baseball Hall of Fame and was the first MLB player to have his uniform number retired by a team when his number 4 was retired by the Yankees.

A native of New York City and a student at Columbia University, Gehrig signed with the Yankees on April 29, 1923. He set several major-league records during his career, including the most career grand slams (23; since broken by Alex Rodriguez) and most consecutive games played (2,130), a record that stood for 56 years and was considered unbreakable until Cal Ripken Jr. surpassed it in 1995. Gehrig's consecutive game streak ended on May 2, 1939, when he voluntarily took himself out of the lineup, stunning both players and fans, after his performance in the field had become hampered by an undiagnosed ailment; it was subsequently confirmed to be amyotrophic lateral sclerosis (ALS), an incurable neuromuscular illness that since then is sometimes referred to as "Lou Gehrig's disease" in the United States.

Gehrig never played again and retired in 1939 at age 36. Two weeks later, the ball club held a Lou Gehrig Appreciation Day on July 4, 1939, at the close of which he delivered his speech declaring himself the "luckiest man on the face of the earth" at Yankee Stadium. Two years later, Gehrig died of complications from ALS. In 1969, the Baseball Writers' Association of America voted Gehrig the greatest first baseman of all time, and he was the leading vote-getter on the MLB All-Century Team, chosen by fans in 1999. A monument in Gehrig's honor, originally dedicated by the Yankees in 1941, prominently features in Monument Park at the new Yankee Stadium. The Lou Gehrig Memorial Award is given annually to the MLB player who best exhibits Gehrig's integrity and character.

== Early life ==
Gehrig was born June 19, 1903, at 1994 Second Avenue in the East Harlem neighborhood of New York City; he weighed almost 14 pounds (6.4 kg) at birth. He was the second of four children of German immigrants Anna Christina Foch (1881–1954) and Heinrich Wilhelm Gehrig (1867–1946). Gehrig's father was a sheet-metal worker by trade who was frequently unemployed due to alcoholism and epilepsy, and his mother, a maid, was the main breadwinner and disciplinarian in their family.

Gehrig's mother Christina was born in 1881 in Wilster, Schleswig-Holstein, a province of pre-World War I Germany near the Danish border. She emigrated to the United States in 1899. His father Heinrich was born in 1867 in Adelsheim, Baden (now part of Baden-Württemberg), and came to the U.S. in October 1888. Heinrich originally spent some time in Chicago, but later settled in New York, where he met Christina, who was 14 years his junior. Both parents were Lutheran. They married in 1900.

Gehrig was the only one of the four siblings to live past childhood. His two sisters died at early ages from whooping cough and measles; a brother also died in infancy. From a young age, Gehrig helped his mother with work, doing tasks such as folding laundry and picking up supplies from local stores. Gehrig spoke German during his childhood, not learning English until the age of five. In 1910, he lived with his parents at 2266 Amsterdam Avenue in Washington Heights. Ten years later, the family resided at 2079 8th Avenue in Manhattan. He was known as "Lou" so he would not be confused with his namesake father, who was known as Henry.

Gehrig attended PS 132 in Washington Heights, then went to Commerce High School, graduating in 1921. He first garnered national attention for his baseball ability while playing in a game at Cubs Park (now Wrigley Field) in Chicago on June 26, 1920. His Commerce High School team was playing a local team from Lane Tech High School in front of a crowd of more than 10,000 spectators. With his team leading 8–6 in the top of the ninth inning, Gehrig hit a grand slam completely out of the major league park, which was an unheard-of feat for a 17-year-old.

== College career ==
Gehrig at Columbia University

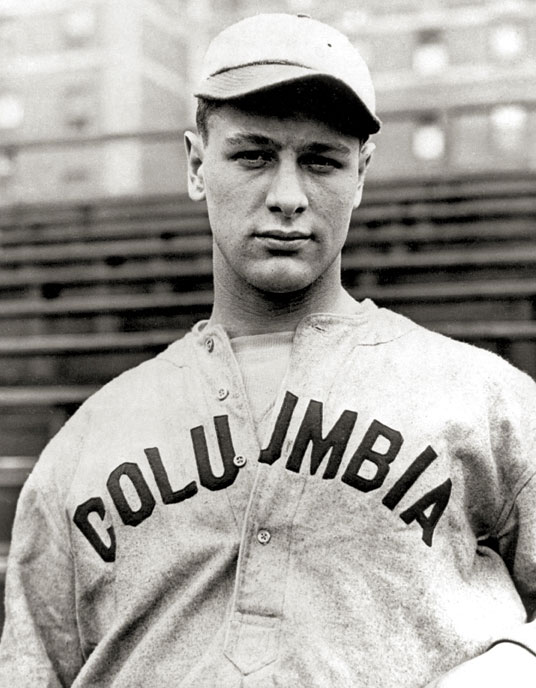
Gehrig on the Columbia baseball team, 1921

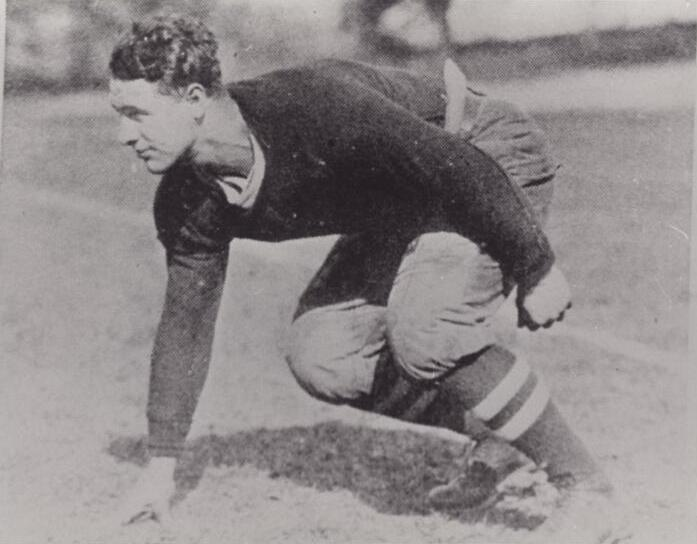
Gehrig on the Columbia football team, 1922

Gehrig studied engineering at Columbia University for two years. Finding the schoolwork difficult, he left Columbia to pursue a career in professional baseball. Gehrig had been recruited to play football at the school, earning a scholarship there, later joining the baseball team.

Before his first semester began, New York Giants manager John McGraw advised Gehrig to play summer professional baseball under an assumed name, Henry Lewis, despite the fact that it could jeopardize his collegiate sports eligibility. After he played 12 games for the Hartford Senators in the Eastern League, he was discovered and banned from collegiate sports his freshman year. In 1922, Gehrig returned to collegiate sports as a fullback for the Columbia Lions football team. Later, in 1923, he played first base and pitched for the Columbia baseball team. At Columbia, he was a member of the Phi Delta Theta fraternity.

On April 18, 1923, the same day the original Yankee Stadium opened for the first time and Babe Ruth inaugurated the new season with a home run against the Boston Red Sox, Columbia pitcher Gehrig struck out 17 Williams Ephs batters to set a team record, though Columbia lost the game. Only a handful of collegians were at Columbia's South Field that day, but more significant was the presence of New York Yankees scout Paul Krichell, who had been trailing Gehrig for some time. Gehrig's pitching did not particularly impress him; rather, it was Gehrig's powerful left-handed hitting. Krichell observed Gehrig hit some of the longest home runs ever seen on various eastern campuses, including a 450-foot (137 m) home run on April 28 at South Field, which landed at 116th Street and Broadway. Scouts saw Gehrig as "the next Babe Ruth."

== Professional career ==
=== Minor leagues ===
Gehrig signed a contract with the Yankees on April 30. Gehrig returned to the minor league Hartford Senators to play parts of two seasons, 1923 and 1924, batting.344 and hitting 61 home runs in 193 games. Except for his games at Hartford, a two-hour car ride away, Gehrig played his entire baseball life—sandlot, high school, college, and professional—with teams based in New York City.

=== New York Yankees (1923–1939) ===
==== 1923–1932 ====
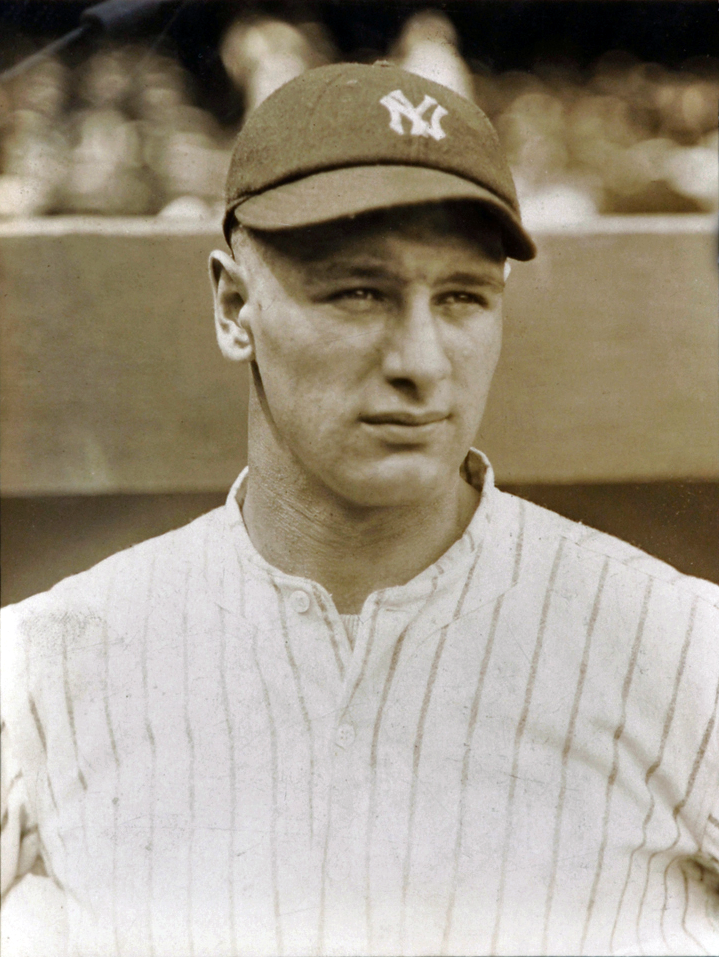
Gehrig in 1923

Gehrig joined the New York Yankees midway through the 1923 season and made his major-league debut as a pinch hitter at age 19 on June 15, 1923. In his first two seasons, Gehrig was mired behind Yankee stalwart Wally Pipp at first base, a two-time American League (AL) home run champion and one of the premier power hitters in Major League Baseball's (MLB) "dead-ball era." Gehrig saw limited playing time, mostly as a pinch hitter, playing in only 23 games and being left off the Yankees' 1923 World Series roster in spite of producing both years (with lofty batting averages of.423 in 1923 and.500 in 1924). On June 2, 1925, the slumping Pipp took himself out of the day's lineup with complaints of a headache and was replaced by Gehrig. Pipp would never get his job with the team back, while Gehrig went on to appear in every game the Yankees played until April 30, 1939. In 1925, Gehrig batted .295, with 20 home runs and 68 runs batted in (RBIs) over 126 games.

Unlike Ruth, Gehrig was not a gifted position player, so he played first base, often the position for a strong hitter but weaker fielder. The 23-year-old Yankee's breakout season came in 1926, when he batted .313 with 47 doubles, an AL-leading 20 triples, 16 home runs, and 112 RBIs. In the 1926 World Series against the St. Louis Cardinals, Gehrig hit .348 with two doubles and four RBIs. The Cardinals won the series 4 games to 3.

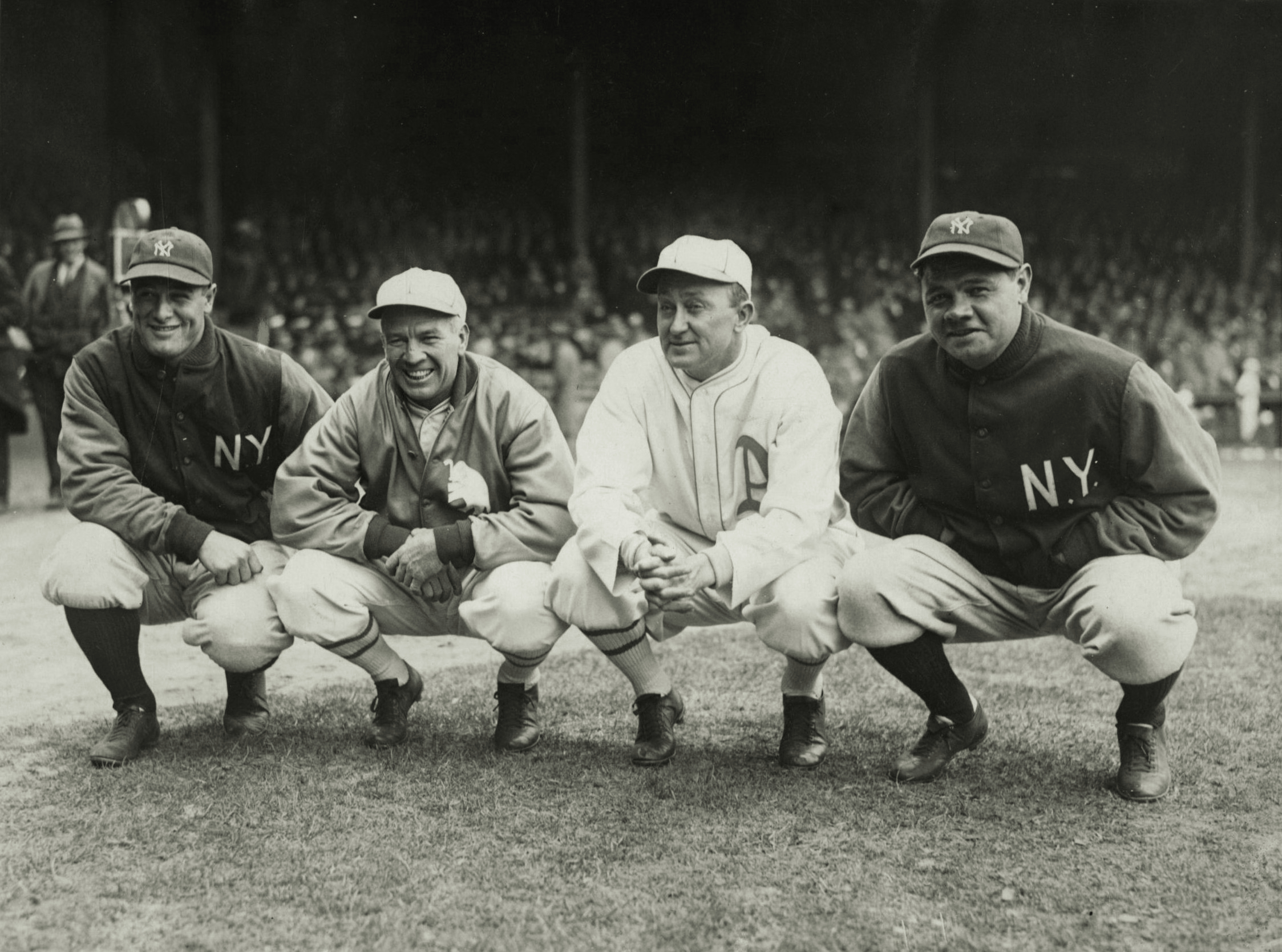
Gehrig, Tris Speaker, Ty Cobb, and Babe Ruth in 1928

In 1927, Gehrig put together one of the greatest seasons by any batter in history, hitting .373, with 218 hits: 101 singles, 52 doubles, 18 triples, 47 home runs, a then-record 175 RBIs (surpassing Ruth's 168 six years earlier), a .474 on-base percentage and a .765 slugging percentage. His 117 extra-base hits that season are second all-time to Ruth's 119 extra-base hits in 1921 and his 447 total bases are third all-time, after Ruth's 457 total bases in 1921 and Rogers Hornsby's 450 in 1922. Gehrig's production helped the 1927 Yankees to a 110–44 record, the AL pennant (by 19 games) and a four-game sweep of the Pittsburgh Pirates in the World Series.

Although the AL recognized his season by naming him league MVP, Gehrig's accomplishments were overshadowed by Ruth's record-breaking 60 home runs and the overall dominance of the 1927 Yankees, a team often cited as having the greatest lineup of all time, the famed "Murderers' Row."

In 1929, the Yankees debuted wearing numbers on their uniforms. Gehrig wore number 4 because he hit behind Ruth, who batted third in the lineup.

In 1932, Gehrig became the first player in the 20th century to hit four home runs in a game, accomplishing the feat on June 3 against the Philadelphia Athletics at Shibe Park. He narrowly missed hitting a fifth home run when Athletics center fielder Al Simmons made a leaping catch of another fly ball at the center-field fence. Following the game, Yankees manager Joe McCarthy told him, "Well, Lou, nobody can take today away from you." On the same day, however, John McGraw announced his retirement after 30 years of managing the New York Giants, so McGraw, not Gehrig, got the main headlines in the city's sports sections the next day. Gehrig's four home run game was only the third in major-league history to that point, the first since Ed Delahanty in 1896.

==== 1933–1939 ====
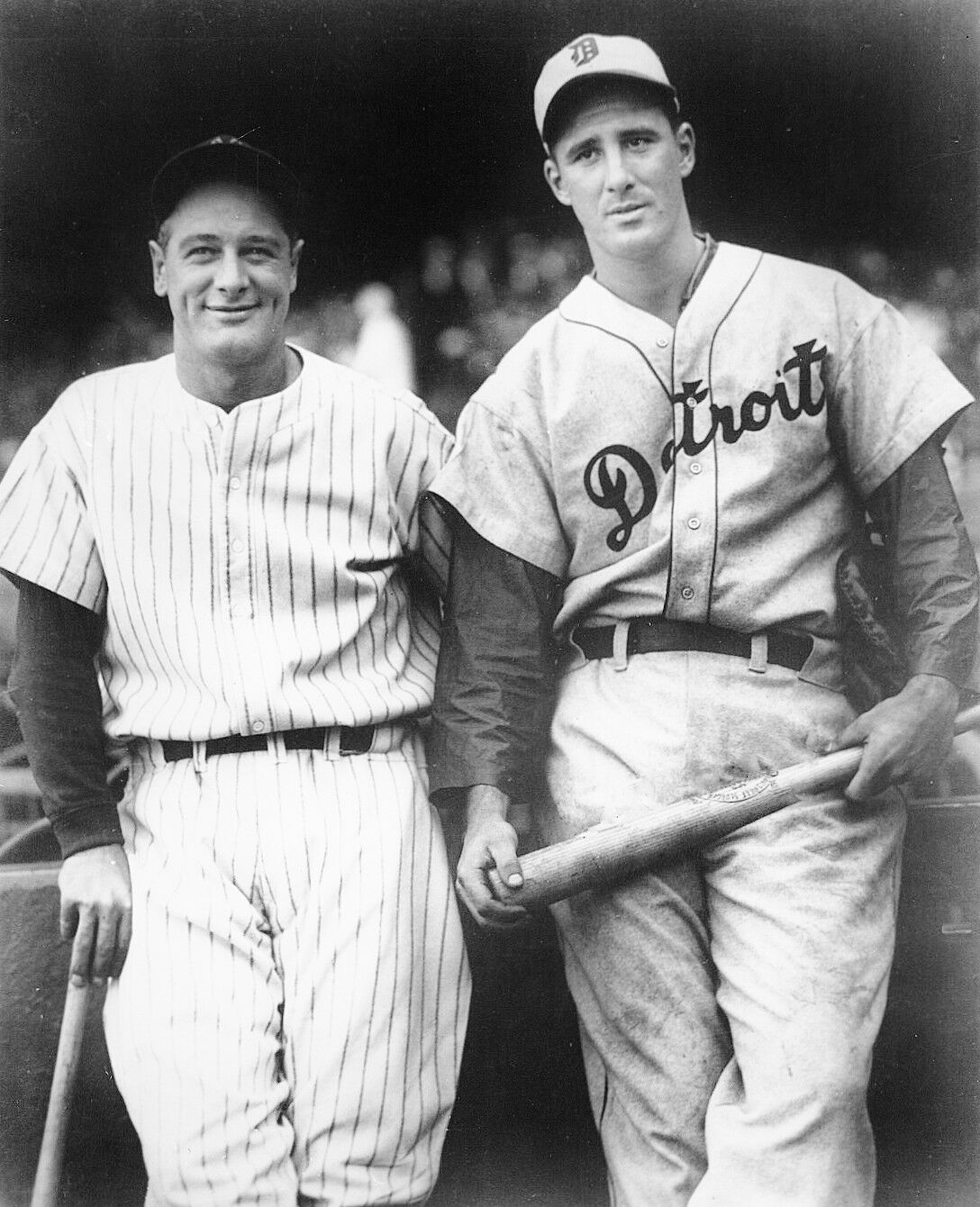
Gehrig and Detroit slugger Hank Greenberg in 1935

On August 17, 1933, facing the St. Louis Browns at Sportsman's Park, Gehrig played in his 1,308th consecutive major-league game, surpassing the longest consecutive games played streak that had been set by Everett Scott from June 1916 to May 1925. Scott attended as a guest of the Browns.

On April 30, 1934, Gehrig hit his 300th home run against the Washington Senators, becoming the second player to reach the milestone after Ruth. Gehrig won the AL Triple Crown in 1934, leading the league with 49 home runs, 166 RBIs and a .363 batting average.

In a 1936 World Series cover story about Gehrig and Carl Hubbell, Time magazine proclaimed Gehrig "the game's No. 1 batsman", who "takes boyish pride in banging a baseball as far, and running around the bases as quickly, as possible".

===== 2,130 consecutive games =====
On June 1, 1925, Gehrig entered the game as a pinch hitter, substituting for shortstop Paul "Pee-Wee" Wanninger. The next day, June 2, Yankee manager Miller Huggins started Gehrig in place of regular first baseman Wally Pipp, who had a headache. Pipp was in a slump, as was the team, so Huggins made several lineup changes in an attempt to boost their performance, replacing Pipp, Aaron Ward and Wally Schang. Fourteen years later, Gehrig had played 2,130 consecutive games, shattering the previous record of 1,307 along the way.

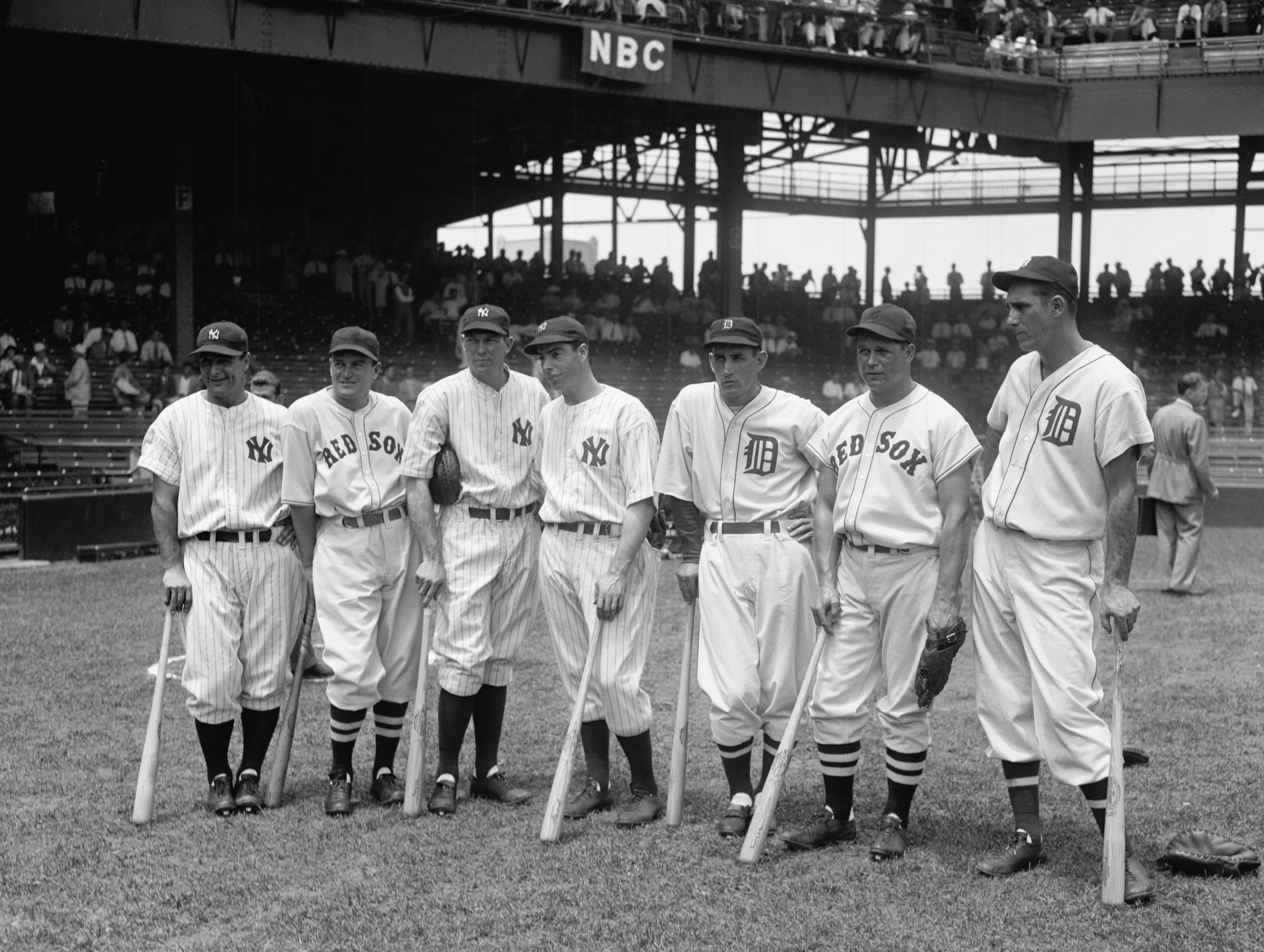
Seven of the American League's 1937 All-Star players, from left to right: Gehrig, Joe Cronin, Bill Dickey, Joe DiMaggio, Charlie Gehringer, Jimmie Foxx, and Hank Greenberg. All seven would be elected to the Hall of Fame.

During the streak, sportswriters in 1931 nicknamed Gehrig "the Iron Horse". In a few instances, Gehrig managed to keep the streak intact through pinch-hitting appearances and fortuitous timing; in others, the streak continued despite injuries. For example:

- On April 23, 1933, a pitch by Earl Whitehill of the Washington Senators struck Gehrig in the head. Although almost knocked unconscious, Gehrig remained in the game.
- On June 14, 1933, Gehrig was ejected from a game along with manager Joe McCarthy; the ejections occurred in the seventh inning and Gerhig had already had three at bats.
- During an exhibition game on June 29, 1934, Gehrig was hit by a pitch thrown by minor-league pitcher Ray White just above the right eye and was knocked unconscious—batting helmets were not commonly used until the 1940s. According to news reports, Gehrig was out for five minutes and then left the game. He was in the lineup for the Yankees' next major-league game, which was played on July 1, giving him a full day to recover.
- On July 13, 1934, Gehrig suffered a "lumbago attack" and had to be assisted off the field. In the next day's away game, he was listed in the lineup as "shortstop", batting lead-off. In his first and only plate appearance, he singled and was promptly replaced by a pinch runner to rest his throbbing back, never taking the field. A&E's Biography speculated that this illness, which he also described as "a cold in his back," might have been the first symptom of the disease which ultimately led to his retirement.

In addition, x-rays taken late in his life disclosed that Gehrig had sustained several fractures during his playing career, although he remained in the lineup despite those previously undisclosed injuries. However, the streak was helped when Yankees general manager Ed Barrow postponed a game as a rainout on a day when Gehrig was sick with the flu, though it was not raining. He continued the streak despite his wife attempting to persuade him to end it at 1,999 games by acting sick. He then had beaten the previous record by nearly 700 games.

Gehrig's record of 2,130 consecutive games endured for fifty-six years until Baltimore Orioles shortstop Cal Ripken Jr. surpassed it on September 6, 1995; Ripken finished with 2,632 consecutive games.

== Personal life ==
Gehrig lived with his parents until 1933, when he was 30 years old. His mother ruined all of Gehrig's romances until he met Eleanor Twitchell (1904–1984), the daughter of Chicago Parks Commissioner Frank Twitchell, in 1932. They began dating the next year, and married in September. She helped Gehrig leave his mother's influence and hired Christy Walsh, Babe Ruth's sports agent; Walsh helped Gehrig become the first athlete on Wheaties boxes.

== Health ==
=== Illness ===
Despite not being diagnosed with amyotrophic lateral sclerosis (ALS) until June 1939, Gehrig began experiencing symptoms as early as midway through the 1938 season. Although his performance in the second half of the season was slightly better than in the first half, Gehrig reported physical changes at the midway point. At the end of that season, he said, "I was tired mid-season. I don't know why, but I just couldn't get going again." Although his final 1938 statistics were above average (.295 batting average, 114 RBIs, 170 hits, .523 slugging percentage, 689 plate appearances with only 75 strikeouts, and 29 home runs), boosted by a hot August, they were significantly down from his 1937 season, in which he batted .351 and slugged .643. He stole his last two bases on September 7, 1938. He had his last extra-base hit, a home run, on September 27, 1938. In the 1938 World Series, he had 4 hits in 14 at-bats (.286 batting average), all singles.

When the Yankees began their 1939 spring training in St. Petersburg, Florida, Gehrig clearly no longer possessed his once-formidable power. Even his base running was affected, and at one point he collapsed at Al Lang Stadium, then the Yankees' spring training park. By the end of spring training, he had not hit a home run. Throughout his career, Gehrig was considered an excellent base runner, but as the 1939 season got under way, his coordination and speed had deteriorated significantly.

By the end of April, eight games into the season, Gehrig's statistics were the worst of his career, with one RBI and a .143 batting average. Fans and the press openly speculated on his abrupt decline. James Kahn, a reporter who wrote often about Gehrig, said in one article:

I think there is something wrong with him. Physically wrong, I mean. I don't know what it is, but I am satisfied that it goes far beyond his ball-playing. I have seen ballplayers 'go' overnight, as Gehrig seems to have done. But they were simply washed up as ballplayers. It's something deeper than that in this case, though. I have watched him very closely and this is what I have seen: I have seen him time a ball perfectly, swing on it as hard as he can, meet it squarely – and drive a soft, looping fly over the infield. In other words, for some reason that I do not know, his old power isn't there ... He is meeting the ball, time after time, and it isn't going anywhere.

Gehrig was indeed meeting the ball, with only one strikeout in 28 at-bats. However, with Gehrig hitless in five of the eight games, McCarthy found himself resisting pressure from Yankee management to switch his slumping player to a part-time role. Things came to a head when Gehrig struggled to make a routine put-out at first base. The pitcher, Johnny Murphy, had to wait for Gehrig to drag himself over to the bag so he could field the throw. Murphy said, "Nice play, Lou." Gehrig's later assessment was very dismissive. "That was the simplest play you could ever make in baseball, and I knew then: There was something wrong with me."

On April 30, Gehrig went hitless against the Washington Senators. He had just played his 2,130th consecutive major league game. On May 2, the next game after a day off, Gehrig approached McCarthy before the game in Detroit against the Detroit Tigers and said, "I'm benching myself, Joe," telling the Yankees' skipper that he was doing so "for the good of the team". McCarthy acquiesced, putting Ellsworth "Babe" Dahlgren in at first base, and also said that whenever Gehrig felt he could play again, the position was his. Gehrig, as Yankee captain, himself took the lineup card out to the shocked umpires before the game, ending the 14-year streak. Before the game began, the Briggs Stadium announcer told the fans, "Ladies and gentlemen, this is the first time Lou Gehrig's name will not appear on the Yankee lineup in 2,130 consecutive games." The Tigers' fans gave Gehrig a standing ovation while he sat on the bench with tears in his eyes. Coincidentally, among those attending the game was Wally Pipp, whom Gehrig had replaced at first base 2,130 games previously. A wire-service photograph of Gehrig reclining against the dugout steps with a stoic expression appeared the next day in the nation's newspapers. He stayed with the Yankees as team captain for the rest of the season but never played in a major-league game again.

=== Diagnosis ===
As Gehrig's debilitation became steadily worse, his wife Eleanor called the Mayo Clinic in Rochester, Minnesota. Her call was transferred to Charles William Mayo, who had been following Gehrig's career and his mysterious loss of strength. Mayo told Gehrig's wife to bring him to the clinic as soon as possible.

Gehrig flew alone to Rochester from Chicago, where the Yankees were playing at the time, and arrived at the Mayo Clinic on June 13, 1939. After six days of extensive testing, doctors confirmed the diagnosis of ALS on June 19, which was Gehrig's 36th birthday. The prognosis was grim: rapidly increasing paralysis, difficulty in swallowing and speaking, and a life expectancy less than three years, although no impairment of mental functions would occur. Gehrig's wife was told that the cause of the disease was unknown, but that it was painless, not contagious, and cruel; the motor function of the central nervous system is destroyed, but the mind remains fully aware until the end. Eleanor later wrote of this time: "The call came from Dr. Mayo and Dr. O'Leary, and it hit me amidships. 'Take your time and give me the works,' Lou had ordered them with a laugh when the testing began. And they took their time and gave him the works. At the outside, they told me on the telephone, he had two and a half years to live." Gehrig often wrote letters to his wife, and one such note written shortly after the diagnosis said in part:

The bad news is lateral sclerosis, in our language "creeping" paralysis. There isn't any cure ... there are very few of these cases. It is probably caused by some germ ... Never heard of transmitting it to mates ... There is a 50–50 chance of keeping me as I am. I may need a cane in 10 or 15 years. Playing is out of the question ...

Gehrig continued,

... and Paul [Dr. O'Leary, Mayo Clinic] suggests a coaching job or job in the office or writing. I made him honestly assure me that it will not affect me mentally. They seem to think I'll get along all right if I can reconcile myself to this condition, which I have done but only after they assured me there is no danger of transmission and that I will not become mentally unbalanced and thereby become a burden on your hands for life. I adore you, sweetheart.

Following Gehrig's diagnosis, he briefly rejoined the Yankees in Washington, D.C. As his train pulled into Union Station, he was greeted by a group of Boy Scouts happily waving and wishing him luck. Gehrig waved back, but he leaned forward to his companion, Rutherford "Rud" Rennie of the New York Herald Tribune, and said, "They're wishing me luck—and I'm dying."

==== Possibility of CTE ====
Although Gehrig's symptoms were consistent with ALS and he did not experience the wild mood swings and eruptions of uncontrolled violence that define chronic traumatic encephalopathy (CTE), an article in the September 2010 issue of the Journal of Neuropathology & Experimental Neurology suggested the possibility that some ALS-related illnesses diagnosed in Gehrig and other athletes may have been CTE, catalyzed by repeated concussions and other brain trauma. In 2012, Minnesota state representative Phyllis Kahn sought to change the law protecting the privacy of Gehrig's medical records, which are held by the Mayo Clinic, in an effort to determine if a connection could exist between his illness and the concussion-related trauma that he had received during his career. Gehrig played fullback on the football team at Columbia University and had a long history of concussions, including several incidents in which he lost consciousness. He played through these injuries.

Gehrig played prior to the advent of batting helmets. To diagnose CTE would require autopsy results; none was conducted on Gehrig before his remains were cremated following his open-casket wake. Multiple physicians have argued that examining records alone would be fruitless.

== Retirement ==
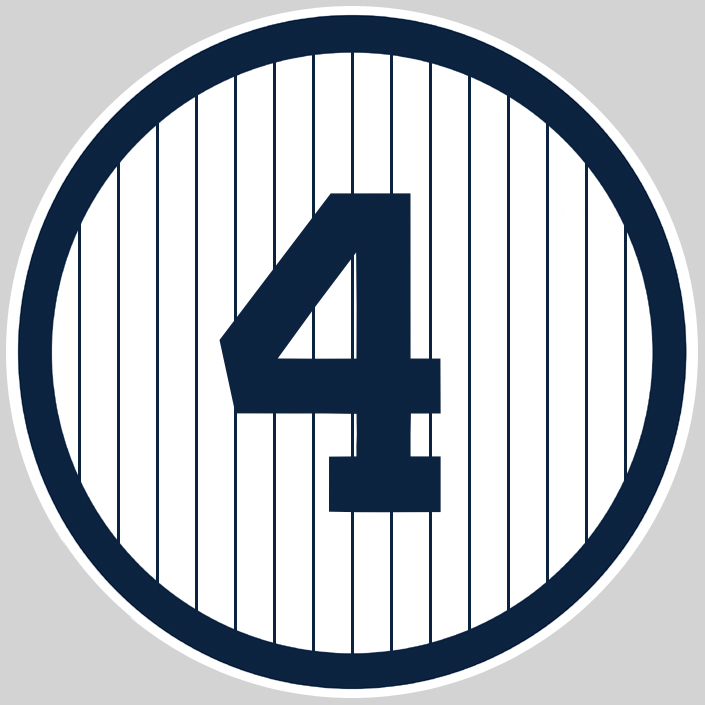
Lou Gehrig's number 4 was retired by the New York Yankees in 1939.

Staff at the Mayo Clinic released their ALS diagnosis to the public on June 19, 1939. Two days later, the Yankees announced Gehrig's retirement, with an immediate public push to honor him.

In its coverage the day after the July 4, 1939 ceremony at Yankee Stadium honoring Gehrig, The New York Times wrote that the ceremony was "perhaps as colorful and dramatic a pageant as ever was enacted on a baseball field [as] 61,808 fans thundered a hail and farewell." Dignitaries and members of the Murderers' Row lineup attended the ceremonies and praised Gehrig. New York mayor Fiorello La Guardia called Gehrig the "perfect prototype of the best sportsmanship and citizenship". James Farley, who was concurrently the United States Postmaster General, chair of the Democratic National Committee and chair of the New York Democratic Party, concluded his speech by predicting, "Your name will live long in baseball and wherever the game is played they will point with pride and satisfaction to your record."

Yankees manager Joe McCarthy then spoke of Gehrig, a close friend. Struggling to control his emotions, McCarthy described Gehrig as "the finest example of a ballplayer, sportsman and citizen that baseball has ever known." He turned tearfully to Gehrig and said, "Lou, what else can I say except that it was a sad day in the life of everybody who knew you when you came into my hotel room that day in Detroit and told me you were quitting as a ballplayer because you felt yourself a hindrance to the team. My God, man, you were never that."

The Yankees retired Gehrig's uniform number 4, making him the first player in MLB history to be so honored. Gehrig was given many gifts, commemorative plaques and trophies. Some were presented by VIPs and others came from the stadium's groundskeepers and janitorial staff. As Gehrig was handed the gifts, he would immediately place them on the ground, as he no longer had the arm strength to hold them. The Yankees presented Gehrig with a silver trophy bearing all of their engraved signatures. Inscribed on the front was a poem written by Times writer John Kieran at the players' request.

The trophy became one of Gehrig's most prized possessions. It is currently on display at the National Baseball Hall of Fame and Museum.

=== "The luckiest man on the face of the Earth" ===
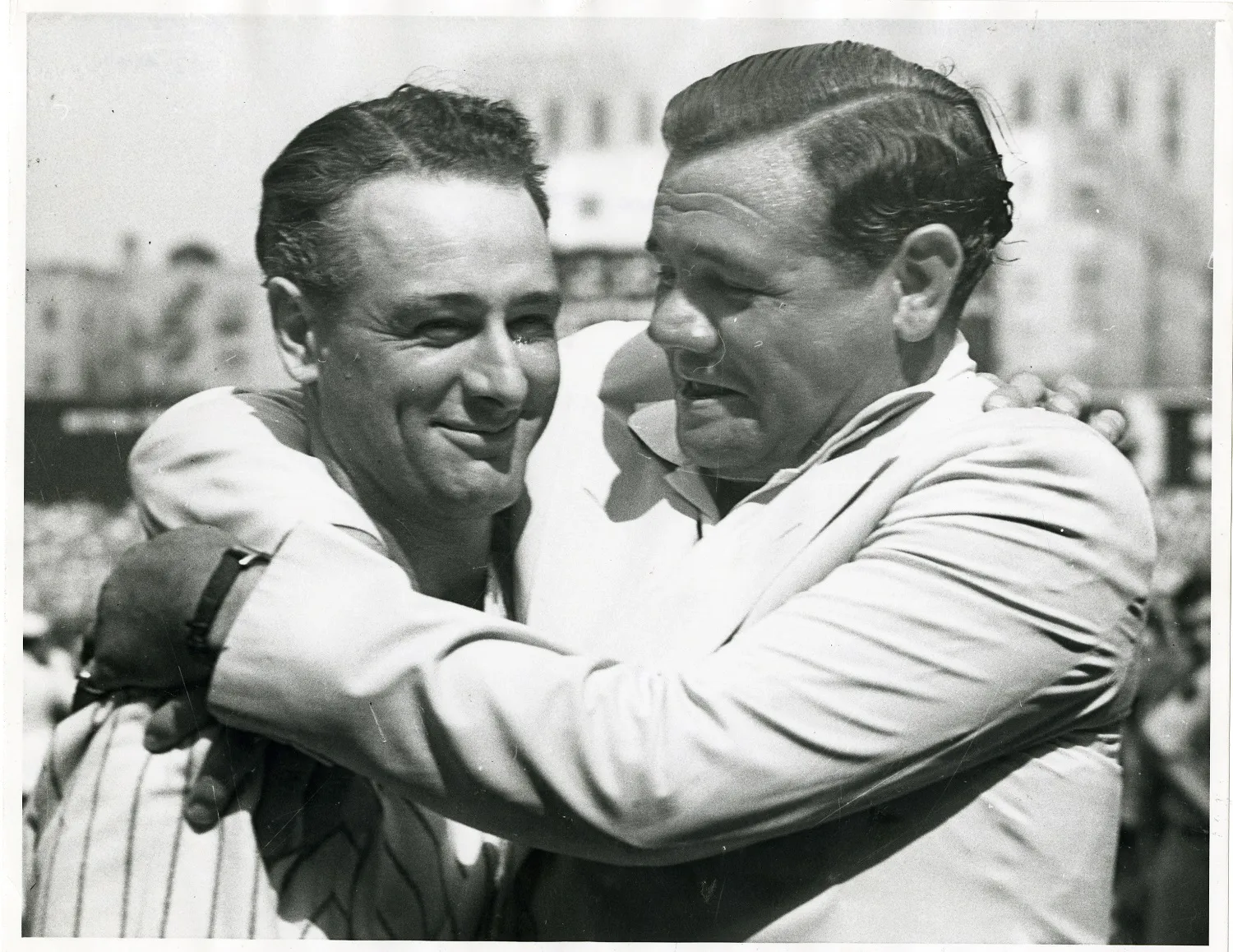
The Yankee dynamic duo reunited – Gehrig and Babe Ruth at Yankee Stadium on July 4, 1939, shortly after Gehrig's retirement. Within a decade, a similar testimonial would honor Ruth, who died from cancer in 1948.

On July 4, 1939, Gehrig delivered what has been called "baseball's Gettysburg Address" to a sold-out crowd at Yankee Stadium in between a doubleheader against the Washington Senators. Having always avoided public attention, Gehrig did not want to speak, but the crowd chanted for him and he had memorized some sentences beforehand.

Fans, for the past two weeks, you've been reading about a bad break. (Note: Also reported as: "...you have been reading about the bad break I got") Today (Note: Also reported as: "Yet today") I consider myself the luckiest man on the face of the (Note: Also reported as: "this") Earth. I have been in ballparks for seventeen years and have never received anything but kindness and encouragement from you fans.

When you look around, wouldn't you consider it a privilege to associate yourself with such fine-looking men as are standing in uniform in this ballpark today? (Note: Also reported as: "Which of you wouldn't consider it the highlight of his career just to associate with them for even one day?") Sure, I'm lucky. Who wouldn't consider it an honor to have known Jacob Ruppert? Also, the builder of baseball's greatest empire, Ed Barrow? To have spent six years with that wonderful little fellow, Miller Huggins? Then to have spent the next nine years with that outstanding leader, that smart student of psychology, the best manager in baseball today, Joe McCarthy? Sure, I'm lucky.

When the New York Giants, a team you would give your right arm to beat, and vice versa, sends you a gift, that's something. When everybody down to the groundskeepers and those boys in white coats remember you with trophies, that's something. When you have a wonderful mother-in-law who takes sides with you in squabbles with her own daughter, that's something. When you have a father and a mother who work all their lives so you can have an education and build your body, it's a blessing. When you have a wife who has been a tower of strength and shown more courage than you dreamed existed, that's the finest I know.

So I close in saying that I might have been given a bad break, but I've got an awful lot to live for. Thank you.

The crowd stood and cheered for almost two minutes. Gehrig's sometimes-estranged former teammate Babe Ruth hugged him as a band played "I Love You Truly" and the crowd chanted, "We love you, Lou!". The Times account the following day called the moment "one of the most touching scenes ever witnessed on a ball field" that made even hard-boiled reporters "swallow hard".

== Career overall ==
Gehrig was a productive hitter in the postseason. He played in the World Series seven times and won six of them. In 34 total World Series games (1926, 1927, 1928, 1932, 1936, 1937, 1938), he batted .361 (43-for-119) with 8 doubles, 3 triples, 10 home runs, 35 RBI, 26 walks, .483 on-base percentage, .731 slugging percentage, and 1.214 on-base plus slugging percentage.

=== Statistics and achievements ===
Category	Years	WAR	G	AB	R	H	2B	3B	HR	TB	XBH	RBI	SB	BB	AVG	OBP	SLG	OPS	FLD%
Total	17	113.7	2,164	8,001	1,888	2,721	534	163	493	5,060	1,190	1,995	102	1,508	.340	.447	.632	1.080	.991

Source: Baseball-Reference.com profile Retrosheet profile

== Later life ==
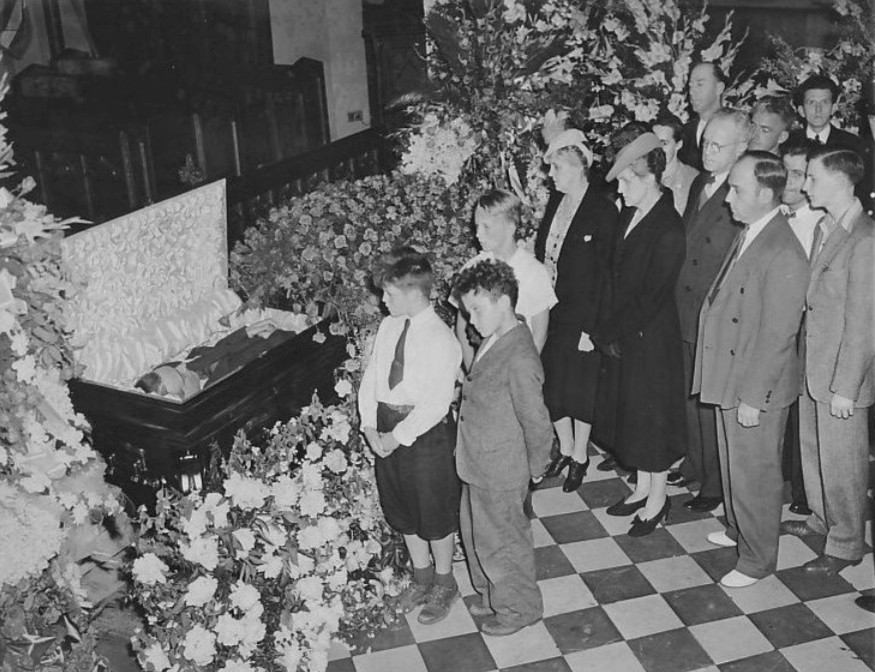
Gehrig's funeral at Christ Episcopal Church in Riverdale, Bronx, June 4, 1941

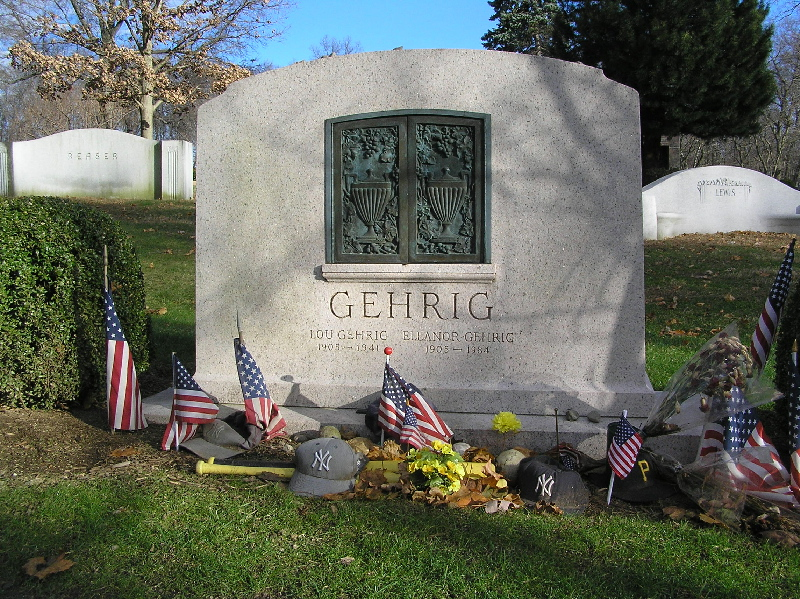
Lou and Eleanor Gehrig's headstone in Kensico Cemetery. The year of his birth was erroneously inscribed as "1905"

Gehrig played his last game for the Yankees on April 30, 1939. On July 11, he appeared at the All-Star Game at Yankee Stadium as the AL team captain, officially on the roster as a reserve player, exchanging lineup cards prior to the game.

Following his retirement from baseball, Gehrig wrote, "Don't think I am depressed or pessimistic about my condition at present." Struggling against his ever-worsening physical condition, he added, "I intend to hold on as long as possible and then if the inevitable comes, I will accept it philosophically and hope for the best. That's all we can do."

In October 1939, Gehrig accepted Mayor Fiorello La Guardia's appointment to a ten-year term as a New York City parole commissioner. Gehrig had moved from New Rochelle to Riverdale to satisfy a residency requirement for the job, and was sworn into office on January 2, 1940. The Parole Commission commended Gehrig for his "firm belief in parole, properly administered", stating that he "indicated he accepted the parole post because it represented an opportunity for public service. He had rejected other job offers—including lucrative speaking and guest appearance opportunities—worth far more financially than the $5,700 a year commissionership." Gehrig visited New York's correctional facilities but insisted that the visits not be covered by news media. (Note: In appointing Gehrig as a parole commissioner, LaGuardia said, "I believe he will be not only a capable, intelligent commissioner but that he will be an inspiration and a hope to many of the younger boys who have gotten into trouble. Surely the misfortune of some of the young men will compare as something trivial with what Mr. Gehrig has so cheerfully and courageously faced.")

Gehrig continued to go regularly to his City Hall office until a month before his death. He was often helped by his wife Eleanor, who would guide his hand when he had to sign official documents. When Gehrig's deteriorating physical condition made it impossible for him to continue, he quietly resigned from the position about a month before his death.

=== Death ===
At 10:10 p.m. on June 2, 1941, 17 days before his 38th birthday, Gehrig died at his home at 5204 Delafield Avenue in the Riverdale neighborhood of the Bronx. Upon hearing the news, Babe Ruth and his wife Claire went to the Gehrig residence to console Gehrig's wife Eleanor. Mayor Fiorello La Guardia ordered that flags in New York be flown at half-staff. MLB ballparks around the nation did likewise.

Thousands viewed Gehrig's body at the Church of the Divine Paternity; Ruth wept. Following the funeral across the street from his house at Christ Episcopal Church of Riverdale, Gehrig's remains were cremated on June 4 at Kensico Cemetery in Valhalla, New York, 21 miles (34 km) north of Yankee Stadium in suburban Westchester County. Gehrig's ashes were locked into a crypt in the stone monument marking his grave. Gehrig and Ed Barrow are interred in the same section of the cemetery, which is next door to Gate of Heaven, where the graves of Ruth and Billy Martin lie in Section 25.

Eleanor never remarried and was quoted as saying, "I had the best of it. I would not have traded two minutes of my life with that man for forty years with another." She dedicated the remainder of her life to supporting ALS research. She died on her 80th birthday, March 6, 1984, and was interred with him in Kensico Cemetery.

== Legacy ==
=== Statistical accomplishments ===
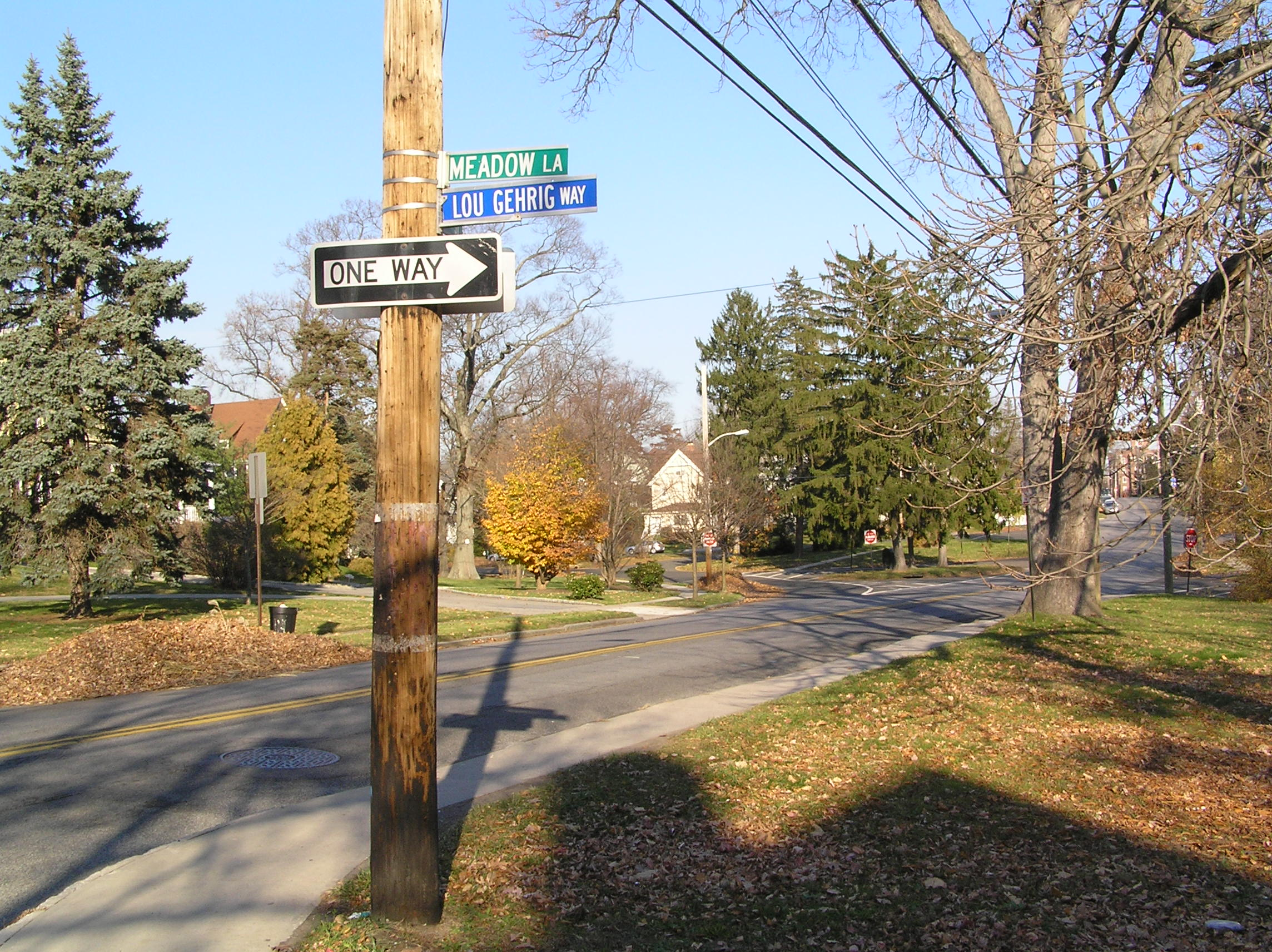
Lou Gehrig Way in New Rochelle, New York: Gehrig lived in a modest home at 9 Meadow Lane in the Residents Park section near the College of New Rochelle.

Despite playing in the shadow of Babe Ruth for two-thirds of his career, Gehrig was one of the best run producers in baseball history; he had 509 RBIs during a three-season stretch (1930–32). Only two other players, Jimmie Foxx with 507 and Hank Greenberg with 503, have surpassed 500 RBIs in any three seasons; their totals were not consecutive. (Ruth had 498.) Playing 14 complete seasons, Gehrig had 13 consecutive seasons with 100 or more RBIs, a major-league record shared with Foxx and tied in 2010 by Alex Rodriguez.

Gehrig had six seasons where he batted .350 or better, with a high of .379 in 1930, plus a seventh season at .349. Gehrig led the American League in runs scored four times, home runs three times, and RBIs five times. His 185 RBIs in 1931 remain the AL record as of 2025 and rank second all-time to Hack Wilson's 191 in 1930. On the single-season RBI list, Gehrig ranks second, fifth (175) and sixth (174), with four additional seasons of over 150 RBIs.

Gehrig holds the baseball record for most seasons with 400 total bases or more, accomplishing this feat five times in his career. For all players with less than 10,000 plate appearances, Gehrig holds the record for most total bases, having recorded 5,060 in 9,665 plate appearances. He batted fourth in the lineup behind Ruth, making intentionally walking Ruth counterproductive for opposing pitchers.

Lefty Grove, one of the AL's best pitchers during Gehrig's playing days who often threw the ball at batters, refrained from doing so to Gehrig. "You can never tell what that big fellow will do if you get him mad at you," Grove explained.

=== Comparisons with Ruth ===
Unlike Ruth, Gehrig had the physique of a power hitter. Ruth usually hit home runs as high fly balls, while Gehrig's were line drives. During the ten seasons (1925–1934) in which Gehrig and Ruth were teammates and next to each other in the batting order and played a majority of the games, Gehrig had more home runs than Ruth only once, in 1934 (Ruth's last year with the Yankees, as a 39-year-old), when he hit 49 to Ruth's 22. Ruth played 125 games that year, and a handful in 1935 before retiring.

They tied at 46 in 1931. Ruth had 424 home runs compared to Gehrig's 347. Gehrig outpaced Ruth in RBIs, 1,436 to 1,316. Gehrig had a .343 batting average, compared to .338 for Ruth, during this period.

"Line-Up for Yesterday"

G is for Gehrig,
The Pride of the Stadium;
His record pure gold,
His courage, pure radium.

— Ogden Nash, SPORT (January 1949)

=== Election to the Baseball Hall of Fame ===
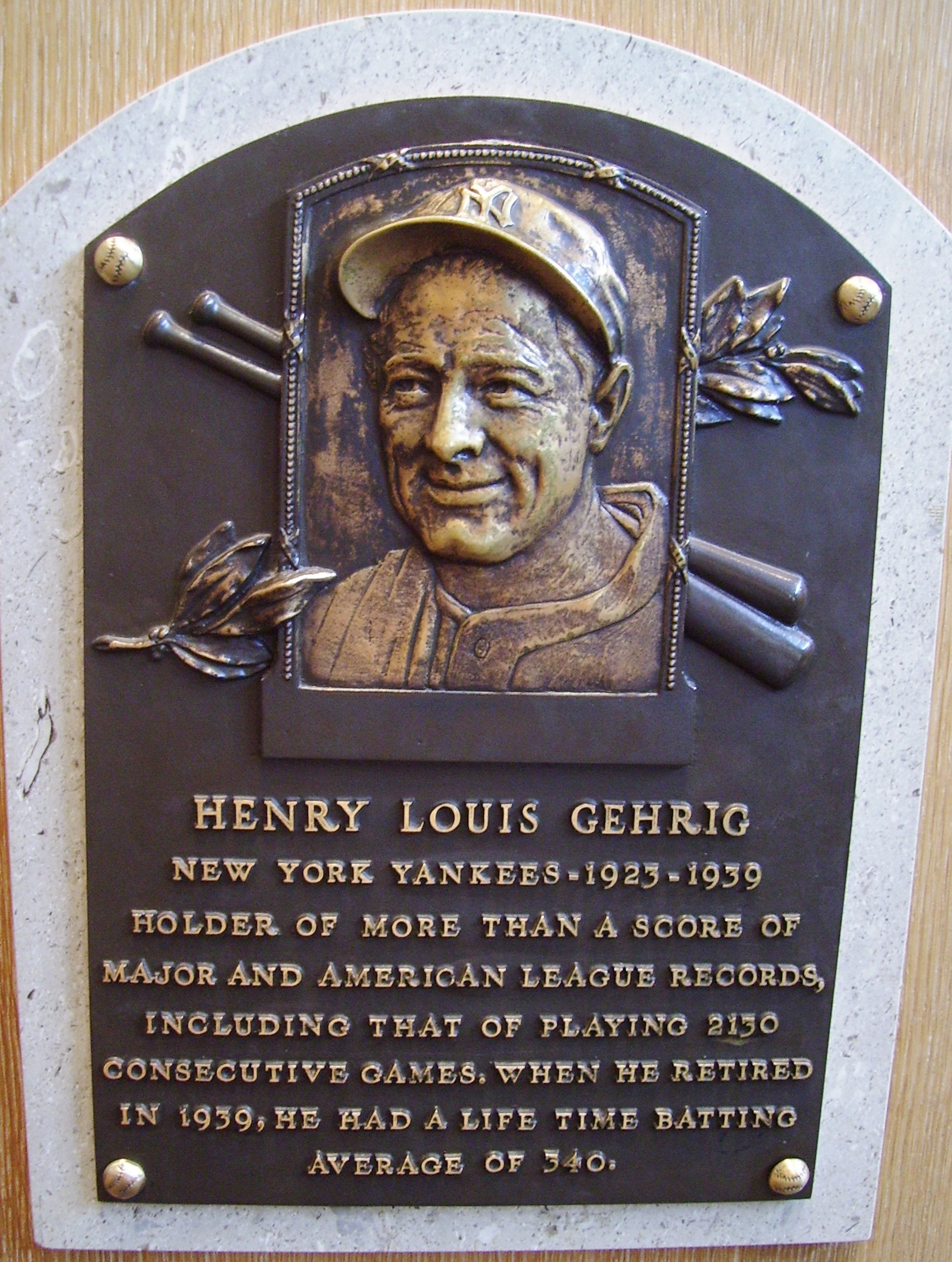
Gehrig's plaque in the National Baseball Hall of Fame

During a winter meeting of the Baseball Writers' Association on December 7, 1939, Gehrig was elected to the Baseball Hall of Fame in a special election related to his illness. At age 36, he was the youngest player to be so honored, since surpassed by Sandy Koufax, who was five months younger than Gehrig at the time of his election in 1972.

Gehrig never had a formal induction ceremony. In July 2013, he and 11 other deceased ballplayers received a special tribute during the induction ceremony, held during "Hall of Fame Induction Weekend" in Cooperstown, New York.

=== Monument ===
The Yankees dedicated a monument to Gehrig in center field at Yankee Stadium on July 6, 1941; the shrine lauded him as, "A man, a gentleman and a great ballplayer whose amazing record of 2,130 consecutive games should stand for all time." Gehrig's monument joined the one placed there in 1932 to Miller Huggins, which would eventually be followed by Babe Ruth's in 1949.

=== Memorial plaques ===
Gehrig's birthplace in Manhattan at 1994 Second Avenue, near E. 103rd Street, is memorialized with a plaque marking the site, as is another early residence on 309 E. 94th Street, near Second Avenue. Gehrig died in a white house at 5204 Delafield Avenue in the Riverdale section of the Bronx. The house still stands today on the east side of the Henry Hudson Parkway and is likewise marked by a plaque.

=== Lou Gehrig Memorial Award ===
The Lou Gehrig Memorial Award is given annually to an MLB player who best exhibits the character and integrity of Gehrig, off and on the field. The award was created by the Phi Delta Theta fraternity in honor of Gehrig, who was a member of the fraternity at Columbia University. It was first presented in 1955, 14 years after Gehrig's death. The award's purpose is to recognize a player's exemplary contributions in "both his community and philanthropy." The bestowal of the award is overseen by the headquarters of the Phi Delta Theta fraternity in Oxford, Ohio, and the name of each winner is inscribed onto the Lou Gehrig Award plaque in the Baseball Hall of Fame in Cooperstown.

=== Medical Center ===
The ALS treatment and research center at his alma mater, Columbia University, is named The Eleanor and Lou Gehrig ALS Center. Located at NewYork-Presbyterian Hospital and Columbia University Irving Medical Center, they have a clinical and research function directed at ALS and the related motor neuron diseases primary lateral sclerosis and progressive muscular atrophy.

=== Lou Gehrig Day ===
In March 2021, Major League Baseball declared June 2 henceforth to be Lou Gehrig Day. June 2 was chosen because it is the anniversary of when Gehrig became the Yankees' starting first baseman in 1925 and when he died in 1941.

== Records, awards, and accomplishments ==
Sixty years after his farewell to baseball, Gehrig received the most votes of any baseball player on the Major League Baseball All-Century Team, chosen by fan balloting in 1999.

In 1999, editors at Sporting News ranked Gehrig sixth on their list of "Baseball's 100 Greatest Players". In 2022, as part of their SN Rushmore project, they named Gehrig on their "New York Mount Rushmore of Sports", along with fellow Yankee Babe Ruth, New York Knicks basketball player Walt Frazier, and New York Giants football player Lawrence Taylor.

=== Records ===
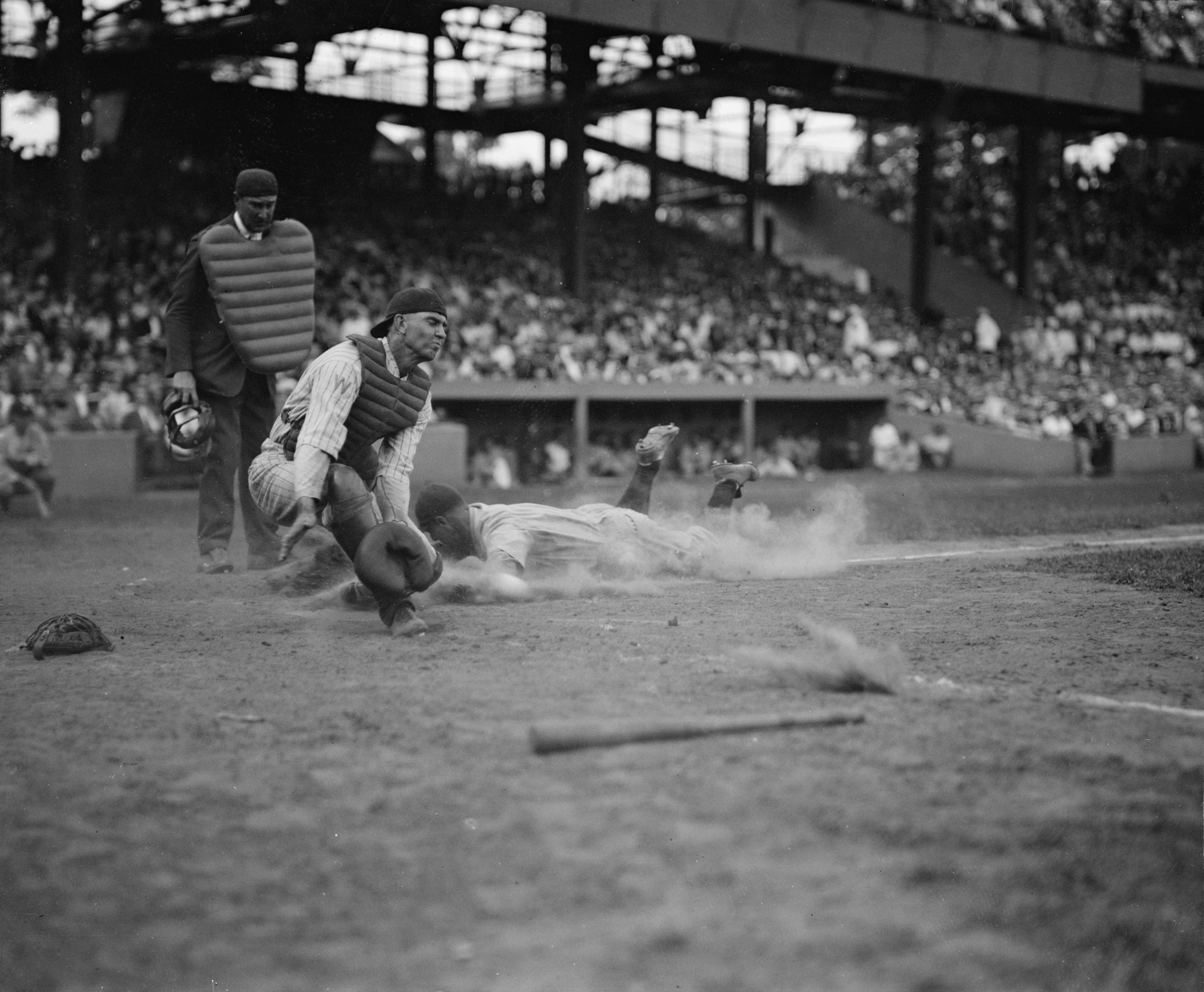
Gehrig sliding into home plate in 1925

MLB Records
Accomplishment	Record	Refs
Most consecutive seasons with 120+ RBIs	8 (1927–1934)	
Highest on-base percentage by a first baseman	.447	
Highest slugging percentage by a first baseman	.632	
Most extra base hits by a first baseman	1,190	
Single–season
Most runs batted-in by a first baseman	184 (1931)	
Most runs scored by a first baseman	167 (1936)	
Highest slugging percentage by a first baseman	.765 (1927)	
Extra-base hits by a first baseman	117 (1927)	
Most total bases by a first baseman	447 (1927)	
Single–game
Most home runs	4	

=== Awards and honors ===
Award/Honor	No. of times	Dates	Refs
American League All-Star	7	1933–1939	
American League MVP	2	1927, 1936	
Named starting first baseman on the Major League Baseball All-Century Team	—	1999	
Inducted into National Baseball Hall of Fame and Museum	—	1939	
World Series champion	6	1927, 1928, 1932, 1936, 1937, 1938	

=== Other accomplishments ===
Accomplishment	Year	Ref
Triple Crown (.363 BA, 49 HR, 165 RBI)	1934	
Only player in history to collect 400 total bases in five seasons	1927, 1930, 1931, 1934, 1936	
With Stan Musial, one of two players to collect at least 500 doubles, 150 triples, and 450 home runs in a career	–	
One of only four players, with Babe Ruth, Stan Musial, and Ted Williams, to end their career with a minimum .330 batting average, 450 home runs, and 1,800 RBI	–	
With Albert Pujols, one of two players to hit 40 doubles and 40 home runs in a season three times	1927, 1930, 1934	
Scored game-winning run in eight World Series games	–	
First athlete ever to appear on a box of Wheaties	–	
First baseball player to have his uniform number retired. His July 4, 1939, farewell speech was voted by fans as the fifth-greatest moment in MLB history in 2002	July 4, 1939	
The Lou Gehrig Memorial Trophy was awarded to the most valuable player in the annual Hearst Sandlot Classic.	1946 - 1965	
A Lou Gehrig 25-cent postage stamp was issued by the U.S. Postal Service on the 50th anniversary of his retirement from baseball, depicting him both in profile and at bat (Scott number 2417)	1989	
On the 70th anniversary of his farewell address in Yankee Stadium, MLB dedicated a day of remembrance to him and to the awareness of ALS	July 4, 2009	

== Film and other media ==
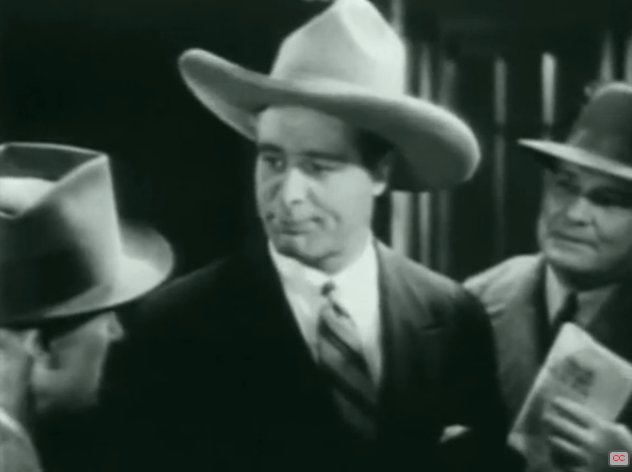
Gehrig in the 1938 feature film Rawhide

In 1936, at the urging of his wife, Eleanor, Gehrig agreed to hire Babe Ruth's publicity agent, who persuaded him to audition for the role of Tarzan in the independent film Tarzan's Revenge. Gehrig only got as far as posing for a widely distributed, and embarrassing, photo of himself in a leopard-spotted costume. When Tarzan creator Edgar Rice Burroughs spotted the outfit, he telegrammed Gehrig, "I want to congratulate you on being a swell first baseman." Producer Sol Lesser was unimpressed with Gehrig's legs, calling them "more functional than decorative," and passed on him for the role which eventually went to the 1936 Olympic decathlon gold medalist Glenn Morris. Gehrig had been known as "Biscuit Pants" due to his thick legs.

Gehrig starred in the 1938 20th Century Fox film Rawhide, playing himself in his only feature-film appearance. At the beginning of the film, Gehrig spoke words which would soon take on a certain poignancy. He states that he is through with baseball. A journalist says that he'll miss the crowds, the cheering, the excitement. Gehrig replies: "That's just what I want to get away from. I had all of that. I'm going to wallow in peace and quiet for the rest of my life. I'm going to hang up my spikes for a swell old pair of carpet slippers."

In 2006, researchers presented a paper to the American Academy of Neurology, reporting on an analysis of Rawhide and photographs of Gehrig from the 1937–1939 period, to ascertain when he began to show visible symptoms of ALS. They concluded that while atrophy of hand muscles could be detected in 1939 photographs of him, no such abnormality was visible at the time Rawhide was shot in January 1938. "Examination of Rawhide showed that Gehrig functioned normally in January 1938," the report concluded.

Gehrig's life was the subject of the 1942 film The Pride of the Yankees, starring Gary Cooper as Gehrig and Teresa Wright as his wife Eleanor. It received 11 Academy Award nominations, winning Film Editing. Former Yankee teammates Babe Ruth, Bob Meusel, Mark Koenig, and Bill Dickey (then still an active player) played themselves, as did sportscaster Bill Stern. In 2008, the AFI honored The Pride of the Yankees as the third-best sports movie.

"The Lou Gehrig Story", about the days leading up to his farewell speech, was featured on an episode of the CBS anthology TV series Climax! on April 19, 1956, starring Wendell Corey and Jean Hagen.

The 1978 television film A Love Affair: The Eleanor and Lou Gehrig Story starred Blythe Danner and Edward Herrmann as Eleanor and Gehrig, respectively. It was based on the 1976 autobiography My Luke and I, written by Eleanor Gehrig and Joseph Durso.

In an episode of the PBS series Jean Shepherd's America, the Chicago-born Jean Shepherd told of how he and his father would watch Chicago White Sox games from the right-field upper deck at Comiskey Park in the 1930s. On one occasion, the Sox were playing the Yankees, and the elder Shepherd had been taunting Gehrig, yelling at him all day. In the top of the ninth, with Sox icon Ted Lyons holding a slim lead, Gehrig came to bat with a man on base, and the elder Shepherd yelled in a voice that echoed around the ballpark, "Hit one up here, ya bum! I dare ya!". Gehrig did exactly that, hitting a screaming liner, practically into the heckler's lap, for the eventual game-winning home run. Shepherd's father was booed mercilessly, and he never again took the younger Jean to a game. Shepherd apparently told this story originally when Gehrig's widow was in the audience at a speaking engagement. (Note: Gehrig hit eight home runs off Ted Lyons, two of them in Chicago: one in 1927 and another on June 25, 1936. The Yankees did indeed win this game by a single run, 7–6, but the homer was not hit in the ninth inning, but instead the second inning.)

Gehrig's digital likeness and the opening quote of the "baseball's Gettysburg Address" are featured in All-Star Baseball 2004.

In 2026, it was announced that a new film about the life of Lou Gehrig was in development. Richard Linklater is tapped to direct the project, with Lorne Michaels producing and Glen Powell starring as Gehrig.

== See also ==
- List of Major League Baseball home run records
- List of Major League Baseball career home run leaders
- List of Major League Baseball batting champions
- List of Major League Baseball doubles records
- List of Major League Baseball annual doubles leaders
- List of Major League Baseball annual triples leaders
- List of Major League Baseball annual home run leaders
- List of Major League Baseball annual runs scored leaders
- List of Major League Baseball annual runs batted in leaders
- List of Major League Baseball runs batted in records
- List of Major League Baseball players who spent their entire career with one franchise
- List of Major League Baseball career triples leaders
- List of Major League Baseball career doubles leaders
- List of Major League Baseball consecutive games played leaders
- List of Major League Baseball career runs batted in leaders
- List of Major League Baseball career runs scored leaders
- List of Major League Baseball career hits leaders
- List of Major League Baseball career total bases leaders
- List of Major League Baseball players to hit for the cycle
- Major League Baseball titles leaders

== Notes ==
Awards and achievements
Preceded by Ed Delahanty	Batters with 4 home runs in one game June 3, 1932	Succeeded by Chuck Klein
Preceded by Jimmie Foxx	American League Triple Crown; 1934	Succeeded by Ted Williams
Preceded by Doc Cramer; Joe DiMaggio	Hitting for the cycle June 25, 1934; August 1, 1937	Succeeded by Moose Solters; Odell Hale
Sporting positions
Preceded by Everett Scott (1925)	New York Yankees team captain April 21, 1935, to June 2, 1941	Succeeded by Thurman Munson (1976)
