= Eleanor Gehrig =

American philanthropist (1904–1984)

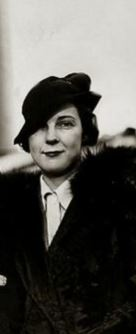
- Eleanor Gehrig, 1935.
- Born: Eleanor Grace Twitchell; March 6, 1904; Chicago, Illinois, U.S.
- Died: March 6, 1984 (aged 80); Manhattan, New York, U.S.
- Spouse: Lou Gehrig (m. 1933; died 1941)

Eleanor Grace Twitchell Gehrig (née Twitchell; March 6, 1904 – March 6, 1984) was an American philanthropist, socialite, sports executive, and memoirist, known as the wife of American baseball player Lou Gehrig. After Gehrig's death she continued to promote his legacy and contribute to Amyotrophic lateral sclerosis (ALS or Lou Gehrig's disease) research.

In 1976 she released her autobiography, My Luke and I.

== Biography ==
=== Early years ===
Eleanor Twitchell was born March 6, 1904, in Chicago, the daughter of Nellie (née Mulvaney 1884–1968) and Frank Twitchell. She had one brother, Frank. Eleanor stated in her memoir she was a product of the roaring twenties and during this time in Chicago she led a party-girl lifestyle while climbing Chicago's social ladder, eventually meeting Gehrig at a party while he was in town for a game.

Eleanor traveled around the country with him during his baseball career and in his final years took care of him. In 1935, Eleanor produced a song with Fred Fisher titled "I Can't Get to First Base With You".

At the height of a storied career, her husband was forced to retire in 1939 due to his diagnosis with the then little-known disease Amyotrophic lateral sclerosis (ALS), which would eventually become known also as Lou Gehrig's Disease. Gehrig died in 1941 from the illness at the age of 37.

=== Charitable work ===
She took control of Gehrig's estate after his death. During World War II she raised money for the cause by auctioning off some of her husband’s memorabilia, raising six million dollars. She also registered to work with the American Red Cross Motor Corps. President Franklin D. Roosevelt heralded her for her efforts and summoned her to meet with him at the Little White House. In the 1960s, she stopped an alcohol brand from using Gehrig's image for an advertisement, only wanting her husband's image to be used for the public good.

Gehrig served as National Campaign Chair on the board of the Muscular Dystrophy Association. Gehrig petitioned Congress to provide funding for research on the disease and the creation and funding for a national institute on multiple sclerosis.

=== Sports executive ===
In 1945 Gehrig was named the vice president of the All-America Football Conference (AAFC), a new professional football league launched to compete with the National Football League (NFL). As such she became the first female sports league executive in the United States.

=== Death and legacy ===
Eleanor died on her 80th birthday in 1984, never having remarried, and left no survivors, spending her life devoted to her husband and his legacy. She donated $100,000 to the Rip Van Winkle Foundation, which in turn formed The Lou Gehrig Society, whose mission is to support research for ALS and the legacy of the Gehrigs. She also donated $100,000 to Columbia University, which then established the Eleanor and Lou Gehrig ALS Center on the school's campus. Gehrig donated the remaining memorabilia in her possession to the National Baseball Hall of Fame and Museum. In 2003, journalist Sean Kirst published an essay titled "The Ashes of Lou Gehrig" which discusses Eleanor's concern over Gehrig's grave due to vandalism and her wishes to have her ashes mixed with his after her death.

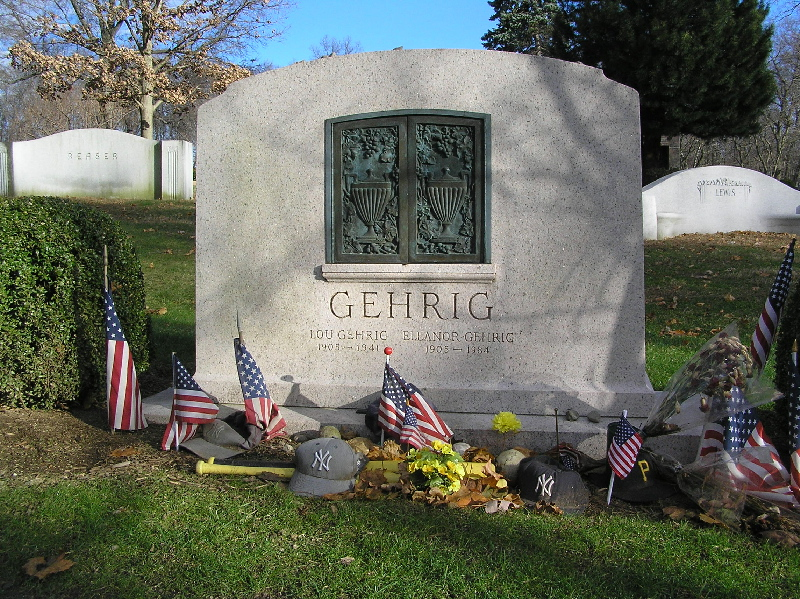
Lou and Eleanor Gehrig's headstone in Kensico Cemetery (the year of his birth was erroneously inscribed as "1905")

=== Portrayal in media ===
Eleanor was portrayed by Teresa Wright in the 1942 film The Pride of the Yankees. The film was a hit at the box office and was nominated for eleven Academy Awards. Eleanor served as consultant to the film and was paid $30,000 for her life rights. Teresa Wright was nominated for the Academy Award for Best Actress for her performance.

She has been portrayed on television in a 1943 Lux Radio Theatre production by Virginia Bruce and a 1949 Screen Directors Playhouse production by Lurene Tuttle.

In 1976, her autobiography was turned into a television film titled A Love Affair: The Eleanor and Lou Gehrig Story, with herself portrayed by Blythe Danner. The film was nominated for two Emmy Awards.

== Works ==
- My Luke and I. New York: Thomas Y. Crowell Co., 1976.
