= Neuropathia mucinosa cutanea =

- Specialty: Dermatology

Neuropathia mucinosa cutanea is a cutaneous condition characterized by livedo reticularis on the legs and hyperesthesia.

== See also ==
- Nodular lichen myxedematosus
- List of cutaneous conditions
