= Journal of Neuropathology & Experimental Neurology =

- Discipline: Neurology
- Language: English
- Edited by: Raymond A. Sobel

Publication details
- History: 1942–present
- Publisher: Oxford University Press
- Frequency: Monthly
- Impact factor: 3.797 (2014)

Standard abbreviations
- ISO 4: J. Neuropathol. Exp. Neurol.

Indexing
- CODEN: JNENAD
- ISSN: 0022-3069 (print); 1554-6578 (web)
- LCCN: 45003177
- OCLC no.: 771166656

Links
- Journal homepage; Online access; Online archive

The Journal of Neuropathology & Experimental Neurology is a monthly peer-reviewed medical journal covering neuropathology and experimental neuroscience. It is published by Oxford University Press and the editor-in-chief is Raymond A. Sobel (Stanford University School of Medicine). It was established in 1942 and is the official journal of the American Association of Neuropathologists.

== Abstracting and indexing ==
The journal is abstracted and indexed in the Science Citation Index, Current Contents/Life Sciences, BIOSIS Previews, and Index Medicus/MEDLINE/PubMed. According to the Journal Citation Reports, the journal has a 2014 impact factor of 3.797.

== Past editors-in-chief ==
- 1942–1949: George B. Hassin
- 1950–1952: Joseph H. Globus
- 1953–1960: Armando Ferraro
- 1962–1983: Arthur Weil
