= The Pride of the Yankees =

1942 film by Sam Wood

The Pride of the Yankees: The Life of Lou Gehrig
- Theatrical release poster
- Directed by: Sam Wood
- Screenplay by: Jo Swerling; Herman J. Mankiewicz
- Story by: Paul Gallico
- Produced by: Samuel Goldwyn; William Cameron Menzies
- Starring: Gary Cooper; Teresa Wright; Babe Ruth; Walter Brennan
- Cinematography: Rudolph Maté
- Edited by: Daniel Mandell
- Music by: Leigh Harline
- Production company: Samuel Goldwyn Productions
- Distributed by: RKO Radio Pictures
- Release dates: July 14, 1942 (New York City); August 18, 1942 (Los Angeles)
- Running time: 128 minutes
- Country: United States
- Language: English
- Box office: $4.2 million

The Pride of the Yankees is a 1942 American sports drama film produced by Samuel Goldwyn, directed by Sam Wood, and starring Gary Cooper, Teresa Wright, and Walter Brennan. It is a tribute to the legendary New York Yankees first baseman Lou Gehrig, who died a year before its release, at age 37, from amyotrophic lateral sclerosis (ALS), which later became known to the lay public as "Lou Gehrig's disease".

Though subtitled The Life of Lou Gehrig, the film is less a sports biography than an homage to a heroic and widely loved sports figure whose tragic and premature death touched the entire nation. It emphasizes Gehrig's relationship with his parents (particularly his strong-willed mother), his friendships with players and journalists, and his storybook romance with the woman who became his "companion for life", Eleanor Twitchell. Details of his baseball career—which were still fresh in most fans' minds in 1942—are limited to montages of ballparks, pennants, and Cooper swinging bats and running bases, though Gehrig's best-known major league record—2,130 consecutive games played—is prominently cited.

Yankee teammates Babe Ruth, Bob Meusel, Mark Koenig, and Bill Dickey play themselves, as does sportscaster Bill Stern. The film was adapted by Herman J. Mankiewicz, Jo Swerling, and an uncredited Casey Robinson from a story by Paul Gallico, and received 11 Oscar nominations. It ends with a re-enactment of Gehrig's poignant 1939 farewell speech at Yankee Stadium. The film's iconic closing line—"Today, I consider myself the luckiest man on the face of the Earth"—was voted 38th on the American Film Institute's list of 100 greatest movie quotes. The film was also ranked 22nd on AFI's list of most inspiring movies. In 2024, the film was selected for preservation in the United States National Film Registry by the Library of Congress as being "culturally, historically, or aesthetically significant".

== Plot ==
Lou Gehrig is a young Columbia University student whose old-fashioned mother wants him to study hard and become an engineer, but the young man has a gift for baseball. A sportswriter befriends Gehrig and persuades a scout to come see him play. When his mother gets sick, Gehrig signs with the team he has always revered, the New York Yankees, to pay for the hospital bills. With the help of his father, he endeavors to keep his career change a secret from his mother.

Gehrig works his way up through the minor leagues and joins the Yankees. His hero, Babe Ruth, is at first condescending and dismissive of the rookie, but his strong, consistent play wins over Ruth and the rest of the team. Gehrig is unknowingly included by his teammates in playing pranks on Ruth on the team train.

During a game at Comiskey Park, Gehrig trips over a stack of bats and is teased by a spectator, Eleanor (the daughter of the ballpark hot dog magnate), who laughingly calls him "tanglefoot". Later, they are properly introduced, leading to a relationship, and then an engagement. Gehrig's mother, who still has not accepted the fact that her son will not be an engineer, does not take this news well; Gehrig finally stands up to her, and marries Eleanor.

The Yankees become the dominant team in baseball, and Gehrig becomes a fan favorite. His father and fully converted mother attend games and cheer for him. In a re-creation of a famous (and possibly apocryphal) story, Gehrig visits a crippled boy named Billy in a hospital. He promises to hit two home runs in a single World Series game in the boy's honor—then fulfills his promise.

Gehrig is now the "Iron Horse", a national hero at the peak of his career with multitudes of fans, many loyal friends, and an adoring wife. Then he begins to notice, with growing alarm, that his strength is slowly ebbing away. Though he continues to play, and extends his consecutive-game streak to a seemingly insurmountable record, his physical condition continues its inexorable decline. One day, in Detroit, he tells Yankees manager Joe McCarthy that he has become a detriment to the team and benches himself. After an examination, a doctor gives him the awful news: Gehrig has a rare, incurable disease, and only a short time to live.

A short time later, on Lou Gehrig Day at Yankee Stadium, an older Billy finds Gehrig and shows him that he has made a full recovery, inspired by his hero's example and the two-homer fulfilled promise. Then, as Eleanor weeps softly in the stands, Gehrig addresses the fans: "People all say that I've had a bad break. But today ... today, I consider myself the luckiest man on the face of the Earth."

== Cast ==
As per AFI database:

- Gary Cooper as Lou Gehrig
- Teresa Wright as Eleanor Twitchell Gehrig
- Babe Ruth as himself
- Walter Brennan as Sam Blake
- Dan Duryea as Hank Hanneman
- Elsa Janssen as Mom Gehrig
- Ludwig Stössel as Pop Gehrig
- Virginia Gilmore as Myra
- Bill Dickey as himself
- Ernie Adams as Miller Huggins
- Pierre Watkin as Mr. Twitchell
- Harry Harvey as Joe McCarthy
- Robert W. Meusel as himself
- Mark Koenig as himself
- Bill Stern as himself
- Addison Richards as Coach
- Hardie Albright as Van Tuyl
- Edward Fielding as Clinic doctor
- George Lessey as Mayor of New Rochelle
- Edgar Barrier as Hospital doctor
- Douglas Croft as Lou Gehrig as a boy
- Gene Collins as Billy, age 8
- David Holt as Billy, age 17
- Veloz and Yolanda as specialty dance team
- Frank Faylen as Yankees' 3rd Base Coach (uncredited)
- C. Montague Shaw as Mr. Worthington (uncredited)
- James Westerfield as Spectator (uncredited)
- Lester Dorr as Disappointed fan (uncredited)

== Production ==
Samuel Goldwyn displayed little interest in Sam Wood's initial proposal to make a movie tribute to Gehrig, as he had no knowledge of or interest in baseball. In addition, conventional Hollywood wisdom dictated that sports pictures were box-office poison, as women, who made up more than half the audience and made most movie-going decisions, did not like them. After Wood screened newsreel footage of Gehrig's famous "luckiest man" speech, however, Goldwyn—with tears in his eyes—agreed to produce the picture.

In a 1941 press campaign publicizing plans for the film, RKO Pictures announced a major talent hunt for Gehrig's portrayer, but Goldwyn and Wood reportedly never considered casting anyone but Cooper in the title role. Although he was ideally suited to the part due to his physical resemblance to Gehrig and the quiet strength and masculine appeal that he projected, Cooper was reluctant to accept it because he, like Goldwyn, had no interest in baseball. By one account, he had never watched a game nor even swung a bat prior to taking the role. Another problem was Cooper's age (41), particularly in scenes involving Gehrig as a young man. Cinematographer Rudolph Maté lighted Cooper from below during those early scenes to conceal lines and wrinkles, then gradually reduced and finally eliminated the lighting effect as the story progressed.

Another important (and problematic) casting decision was Babe Ruth, as himself. Ruth's health had been declining steadily since his retirement in 1935, and by 1942 he weighed nearly 270 pounds. He was put on a strict diet to achieve a presentable weight before filming began. This rapid weight loss, on the heels of a heart attack followed by a car accident, combined with the tough shooting schedule and Ruth's propensity to keep late hours, weakened him significantly. By the time filming wrapped, he had developed pneumonia severe enough to require a period of hospitalization.

Multiple published sources have asserted that Cooper, who was right-handed, could not master a convincing left-handed swing. To remedy the problem, the story went, he was filmed wearing a mirror-image uniform and swinging from the right side of the plate, then running to third base instead of first; technicians then purportedly flopped the print of the film. Tom Shieber, Senior Curator at the National Baseball Hall of Fame, has shown, however, that Cooper did indeed learn to bat left-handed, and never wore a backwards Yankees uniform nor ran to third base after swinging. Film footage was, in fact, flopped only once, during a brief sequence portraying Gehrig's minor league days at Hartford, in order to make Cooper appear to be throwing left-handed — a far more difficult task for a right-hander to master. ("[Cooper] threw the ball like an old woman tossing a hot biscuit," said Lefty O'Doul, who tried unsuccessfully to teach him a convincing left-handed throw.) Scenes requiring Cooper to throw a ball as a Yankee were filmed using his stand-in, the left-handed Babe Herman.

Scenes purporting to depict Yankee Stadium, Comiskey Park, and other ballparks were all filmed at Wrigley Field in Los Angeles, home of the Los Angeles Angels of the old Pacific Coast League, and a popular venue for baseball movies of the era, as well as the Home Run Derby television series. Filming at Wrigley took place in the late winter of 1941–1942, and wrapped in early March.[Los Angeles Times, March 8, 1942, p. 49]

== Acknowledgment in opening credits ==
"Appreciation is expressed for the gracious assistance of Mrs. Lou Gehrig and for the cooperation of Mr. Ed Barrow and the New York Yankees arranged by Christy Walsh."

=== Foreword ===
"This is the story of a hero of the peaceful paths of everyday life. It is the story of a gentle young man who, in the full flower of his great fame, was a lesson in simplicity and modesty to the youth of America. He faced death with that same valor and fortitude that has been displayed by thousands of young Americans on far-flung fields of battle. He left behind him a memory of courage and devotion that will ever be an inspiration to all men. This is the story of Lou Gehrig." – Damon Runyon

== Release ==
Gehrig died on June 2, 1941. The film premiered on July 14, 1942, in New York City at the Astor Theatre, and was shown for one night only at "forty neighborhood theatres". Preceding the film was the premiere of an animated short called How to Play Baseball, produced by Walt Disney Animation Studios at Goldwyn's request.

== Reception ==
=== Critical ===
Variety magazine called the film a "stirring epitaph" and a "sentimental, romantic saga ... well worth seeing." Time magazine said the film was a "grade-A love story" done with "taste and distinction" though it was "somewhat overlong, repetitive, undramatic. Baseball fans who hope to see much baseball played in Pride of the Yankees will be disappointed. Babe Ruth is there, playing himself with fidelity and considerable humor; so are Yankees Bill Dickey, Bob Meusel, Mark Koenig. But baseball is only incidental. The hero does not hit a home run and win the girl. He is just a hardworking, unassuming, highly talented professional. The picture tells the model story of his model life in the special world of professional ballplayers." Bosley Crowther of The New York Times called it a "tender, meticulous and explicitly narrative film" that "inclines to monotony" because of its length and devotion to "genial details".

Of Maté's cinematography, the professional journal American Cinematographer wrote: “Maté in this picture does something only rarely seen on the screen, yet which ought to be an integral part of all dramatic cinematography. The dominant mood of the film is simple realism. Therefore Maté begins the picture in a simple, realistic style of camerawork--almost commonplace as first you look at it. But from this simple start, he builds the photographic mood slowly, subtly, almost imperceptibly, until when the climaxing sequences of the picture come--especially the final ‘Lou Gehrig day’ scenes—Maté's camera-treatment rises to a visual crescendo which adds immeasurably in arousing an emotional response. The long-shot down the long, bare tunnel from locker-room to field, when Gehrig and his wife stand there before he goes out to receive the last homage of the packed stadium, is one of the most poignantly moving pieces of photography this writer has ever seen on the screen. It is in itself enough to bring a tear to the most hardened eye.”

On the review aggregator website Rotten Tomatoes, 94% of 33 critics' reviews are positive, with an average rating of 7.2/10. The website's consensus reads: "The equally tragic and heroic story of Yankees first baseman Lou Gehrig is eloquently told here with an iconic star turn by Gary Cooper."

=== Box office ===
The Pride of the Yankees was among the top ten box office films of 1942, earning $3,332,000 in theater rentals from the United States and Canada and an additional $855,000 from foreign rentals. Despite its wide popularity, RKO took a loss of $213,000 on the film due to the small distribution fee that Samuel Goldwyn had negotiated with the studio. All of Goldwyn's pictures produced a loss for RKO no matter how much money they took in; but the studio considered the arrangement acceptable, because its association with Goldwyn lent prestige to RKO, and enhanced sales of its own movies.

== Awards and other recognition ==
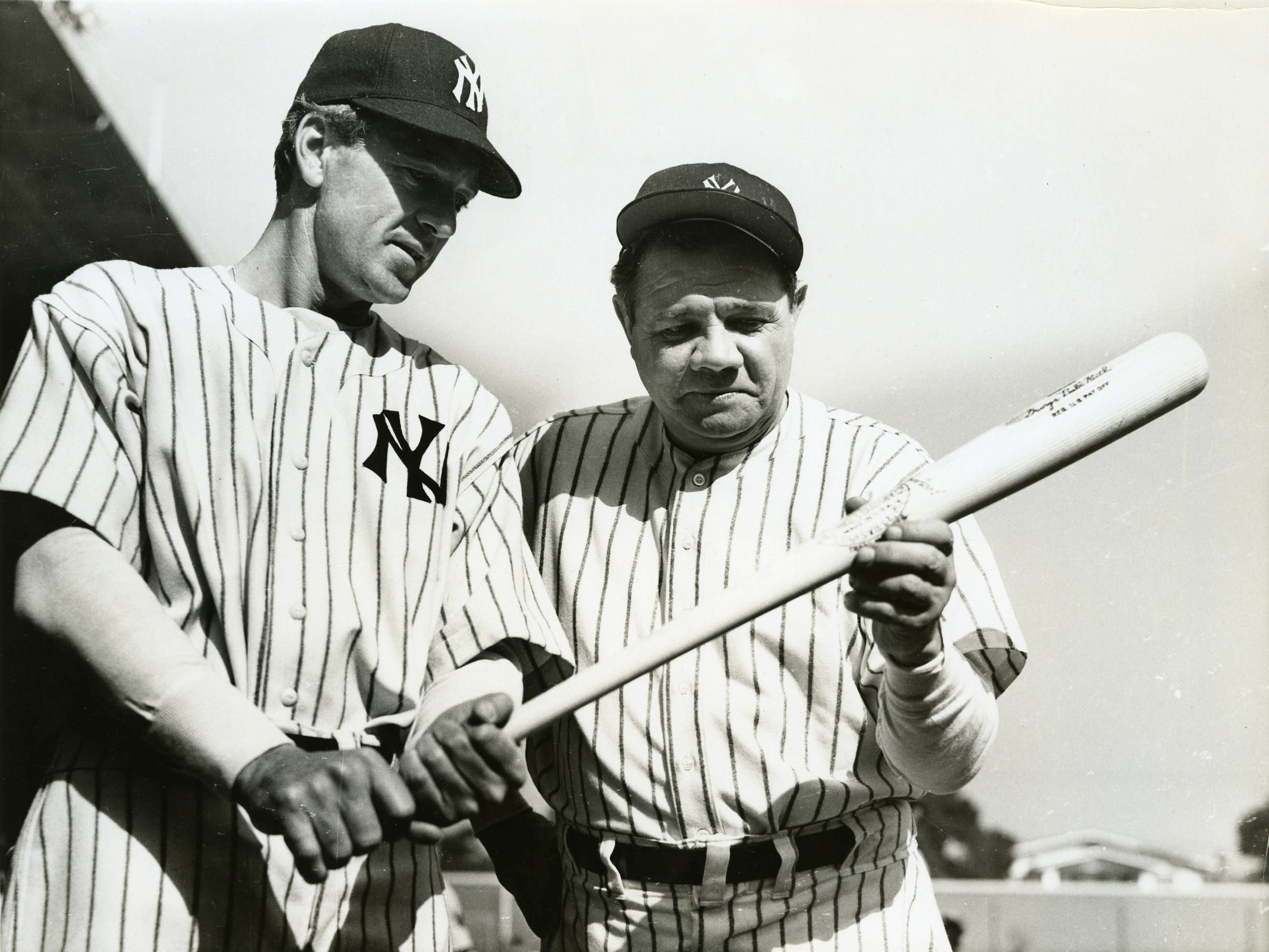
Cooper with Babe Ruth in a publicity photo for the film

Film Editor Daniel Mandell won an Academy Award for his work on The Pride of the Yankees. The film received ten additional Oscar nominations:

- Best Actor in a Leading Role (Cooper)
- Best Actress in a Leading Role (Wright)
- Best Art Direction-Interior Decoration, Black-and-White
- Best Cinematography, Black-and-White
- Best Effects, Special Effects (Jack Cosgrove, Ray Binger, Thomas T. Moulton)
- Best Music, Scoring of a Dramatic or Comedy Picture
- Best Picture
- Best Sound Recording (Thomas T. Moulton)
- Best Writing, Original Story
- Best Writing, Adapted Screenplay

In the American Film Institute's 2008 list "Ten Top Tens"—the top ten films in ten "classic" American film genres—The Pride of the Yankees was ranked third in the sports category. The film was also ranked 22nd in AFI's 2006 100 Years...100 Cheers list of most inspirational movies. Gehrig was named the 25th greatest hero in American cinema by the AFI in 2003.

== Inaccuracies/artistic license ==
As the film opens, Gehrig is depicted belting a home run through a window of the Columbia University athletic building. That building is actually located on the north end of campus, well away from the baseball field; his farthest hits most likely smashed through the windows of a nearby building housing the School of Journalism.

In the film, Gehrig hits two home runs in a World Series game against the St. Louis Cardinals where Babe Ruth also homers. This never occurred against the Cardinals, but did happen in Game 3 of the 1932 World Series versus the Cubs.

In the film, Gehrig meets Eleanor Twitchell early in his career and marries her shortly after his first World Series. Actually the two met in 1931, well after Gehrig was an established star. They were married in 1933.

In the scene where Eleanor looks through Lou's scrapbook, a newspaper clipping about Babe Ruth leaving the Yankees has a September 1935 date. Ruth last played for the Yankees in 1934. He had started the 1935 season as a Boston Brave, but he retired in late May.

In one of the film's more memorable scenes, a physician matter-of-factly informs Gehrig of his tragic diagnosis, dismal prognosis, and brief life expectancy. In fact, Mayo Clinic doctors painted an unrealistically optimistic picture of Gehrig's condition and prospects, reportedly at his wife's request. Among other things he was given "a 50–50 chance of keeping me as I am" for the foreseeable future, and was told that he "...may need a cane in 10 or 15 years." Deliberate concealment of bad news from patients, particularly when cancer or an incurable degenerative disease was involved, was a relatively common practice at the time.

=== Gehrig's farewell speech ===
There is no known intact film of Gehrig's actual speech at Yankee Stadium on July 4, 1939; a small portion of the newsreel footage, incorporating his first and last remarks, is all that survives. For the movie, the speech was not reproduced verbatim; the script condensed and reorganized Gehrig's actual spontaneous and unprepared remarks, and moved the iconic "luckiest man" line from the beginning to the end for heightened dramatic effect. Gehrig's message remained essentially unchanged.

Yankee Stadium Speech
"Fans, for the past two weeks you have been reading about a bad break. Yet today I consider myself the luckiest man on the face of the Earth. I have been in ballparks for seventeen years and have never received anything but kindness and encouragement from you fans.

"Look at these grand men. Which of you wouldn't consider it the highlight of his career just to associate with them for even one day? Sure, I'm lucky. Who wouldn't consider it an honor to have known Jacob Ruppert? Also, the builder of baseball's greatest empire, Ed Barrow? To have spent six years with that wonderful little fellow, Miller Huggins? Then to have spent the next nine years with that outstanding leader, that smart student of psychology, the best manager in baseball today, Joe McCarthy? Sure, I'm lucky.

"When the New York Giants, a team you would give your right arm to beat, and vice versa, sends you a gift – that's something. When everybody down to the groundskeepers and those boys in white coats remember you with trophies — that's something. When you have a wonderful mother-in-law who takes sides with you in squabbles with her own daughter — that's something. When you have a father and a mother who work all their lives so you can have an education and build your body — it's a blessing. When you have a wife who has been a tower of strength and shown more courage than you dreamed existed – that's the finest I know.

"So I close in saying that I might have been given a bad break, but I've got an awful lot to live for."

Film Speech
"I have been walking onto ball fields for sixteen years, and I've never received anything but kindness and encouragement from you fans. I have had the great honor to have played with these great veteran ballplayers on my left – Murderers' Row, our championship team of 1927. I have had the further honor of living with and playing with these men on my right – the Bronx Bombers, the Yankees of today.

"I have been given fame and undeserved praise by the boys up there behind the wire in the press box, my friends, the sportswriters. I have worked under the two greatest managers of all time, Miller Huggins and Joe McCarthy.

"I have a mother and father who fought to give me health and a solid background in my youth. I have a wife, a companion for life, who has shown me more courage than I ever knew.

"People all say that I've had a bad break. But today ... today, I consider myself the luckiest man on the face of the Earth."

== Adaptations to other media ==
The Pride of the Yankees was adapted as an hour-long radio play on the October 4, 1943, broadcast of Lux Radio Theater with Gary Cooper and Virginia Bruce and a September 30, 1949, broadcast of Screen Director's Playhouse starring Gary Cooper and Lurene Tuttle.

== See also ==
- List of baseball films
