= Neuropathology and Applied Neurobiology =

- Discipline: Neurology
- Language: English
- Edited by: Tom Jacques

Publication details
- History: 1975–present
- Publisher: Wiley-Blackwell
- Frequency: Bimonthly

Standard abbreviations
- ISO 4: Neuropathol. Appl. Neurobiol.

Indexing
- ISSN: 0305-1846 (print); 1365-2990 (web)

Links
- Journal homepage

Neuropathology and Applied Neurobiology is a peer-reviewed medical journal in the field of neuropathology.

It is published by Wiley for the British Neuropathological Society. The journal was established in 1975 and is published bimonthly. Its scope includes the publication of reviews, original papers and short reports on clinical and experimental neuropathology. It also includes book reviews. According to the Journal Citation Reports, its 2018 impact factor was 6.878.

== History ==
The journal was established in 1975 with John Cavanagh as editor in chief. He was succeeded by R. O. Weller, James Lowe, Stephen Wharton and Janice Holton. The current editor is Tom Jacques.

== See also ==
- Neurobiology
