= Neuropathology =

Study of disease of nervous system tissue

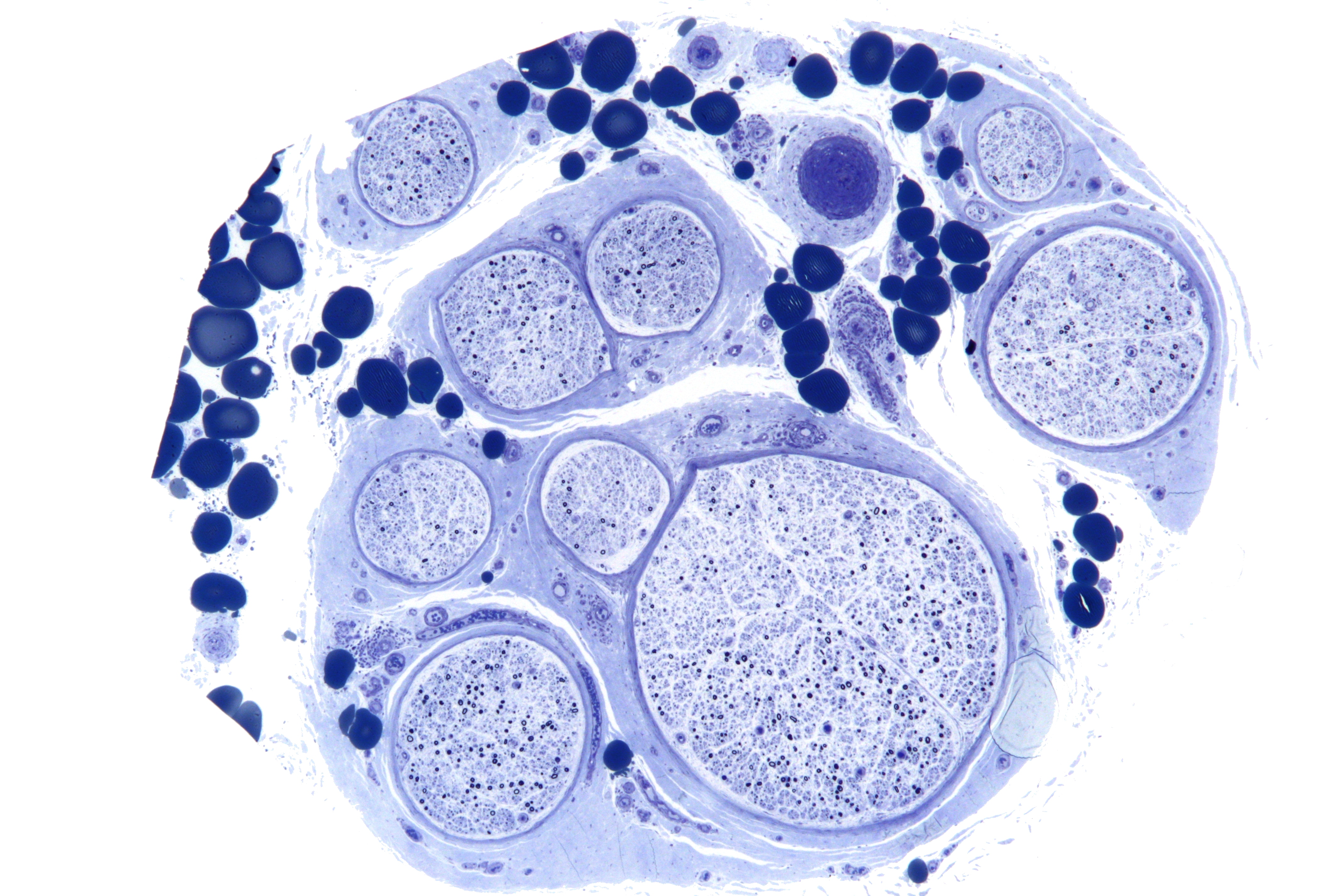
Micrograph of a vasculitic neuropathy. Plastic embedded. Toluidine blue stain.

Neuropathology is the study of disease of nervous system tissue, usually in the form of either small surgical biopsies or whole-body autopsies. Neuropathologists usually work in a department of anatomic pathology, but work closely with the clinical disciplines of neurology, and neurosurgery, which often depend on neuropathology for a diagnosis. Neuropathology also relates to forensic pathology because brain disease or brain injury can be related to cause of death. Neuropathology should not be confused with neuropathy, which refers to disorders of the nerves themselves (usually in the peripheral nervous system) rather than the tissues. In neuropathology, the branches of the specializations of nervous system as well as the tissues come together into one field of study.

== Methodology ==
The work of the neuropathologist consists largely of examining autopsy or biopsy tissue from the brain and spinal cord to aid in diagnosis of disease. In addition to brain and spinal cord, tissues of the eyes, nerves, muscles, and tumors are examined. A biopsy is usually requested after a mass is detected by radiologic imaging, the imaging in turn driven by presenting signs and symptoms of a patient. CT and MRI scans are also used to discover lesions in the patient. As for autopsies, the work of the neuropathologist is to make post-mortem diagnosis of diseases such as dementia, Parkinson's disease and other conditions that affect the central nervous system. Tissue samples are researched within the lab for diagnosis, and in forensic investigations to clarify the cause of death.

Biopsies can also consist of the skin. Epidermal nerve fiber density testing (ENFD) is a more recently developed neuropathology test in which a punch skin biopsy is taken to identify small fiber neuropathies by analyzing the nerve fibers of the skin. This pathology test is becoming available in select labs as well as many universities; it replaces the traditional sural nerve biopsy test as less invasive. It is used to identify painful small fiber neuropathies.

Neuropathologists work in hospital labs and clinics, universities, or with the government depending on the situation. They often do not work with patients but only with medical professionals or other officials behind the scene. They research using information given to them by other neurologists and/ or physicians. Neuropathologists may also research in coroner's or morgue offices for forensic projects. The ultimate goal of neuropathologists is to find the medical issue and then formulate a timeline in which to cure the patient's tissue.

== Focus of specialization ==
In many English-speaking countries neuropathology is considered a subfield of anatomical pathology. In contrast, there are a number of independent university chairs in neuropathology and even institutes of neuropathology in German-speaking countries due to a different historical background. A physician who specializes in neuropathology, usually by completing a fellowship after a residency in anatomical or general pathology, is called a neuropathologist. In day-to-day clinical practice, a neuropathologist is a consultant for other physicians. If a disease of the nervous system is suspected, and the diagnosis cannot be made by less invasive methods, a biopsy of nervous tissue is taken and sent to the neuropathologist, who examines it using a microscope or certain molecular methods to make a definitive diagnosis.

Many neuropathologists in Europe have a background in the clinical neurosciences (neurology, psychiatry) as well as pathology.

=== In the US system ===
Neuropathologists are physicians with a Doctor of Medicine (MD) or Doctor of Osteopathic Medicine (DO) degree. They must finish either 3 or 4 years of an anatomical pathology residency followed by 2 years of a neuropathology fellowship and be certified by the American Board of Pathology in both anatomical and neuropathology. This is less specialized neuropathology training than in most other countries. It is also quite common for neuropathologists to have a Ph.D. in a related field. Neuropathologists must have strong communication abilities as they must analyze results and be able to explain the results to patients and/ or physicians (in paper or verbally).

=== In the UK/Canadian/Commonwealth system ===
Neuropathologists are medically qualified practitioners who are registered with the General Medical Council in the UK. A postgraduate qualification in neuropathology is obtained through training and an examination overseen by the Royal College of Pathologists UK. A neuropathologist has training in anatomic pathology followed by training in relation to diagnosis of diseases of the nervous system and muscle. The training in other European and commonwealth countries is similar. In Canada, Neuropathologists complete a 5-year Royal College of Physicians and Surgeons of Canada Neuropathology residency including a year of clinical medicine and a year of anatomical pathology. It is quite common for neuropathologists to have PhDs in a related field.

In addition to examining central nervous system tissue, the neuropathologist usually is assigned the task of examining muscle and peripheral nerve biopsies. Muscle biopsies are taken to aid in the diagnosis of muscle diseases (such as polymyositis, mitochondrial myopathy, etc.). Peripheral nerve is assessed to help work up patients with suspected peripheral neuropathies secondary to such conditions as vasculitis and amyloidosis.

Neuropathology is a heavily research-oriented field.

== Prominent historical and current figures ==
Santiago Ramon y Cajal is considered one of the founders of modern neuroanatomy. Alois Alzheimer, the person after whom Alzheimer's disease is named, is considered an important early contributor to the field.

There are many neuropathologists around the world who have made important clinical and research contributions toward our understanding of diseases that specifically affect the brain (degenerative diseases, multiple sclerosis, stroke, brain tumors, trauma and neuromuscular diseases). The majority are members of the International Society of Neuropathology (ISN). For neuropathologists practicing within the United States of America please refer to the Membership Directory available through the American Association of Neuropathologists (AANP) website. There are also Membership Directories available for many of the neuropathology societies that exist in other specific countries and/or regions of the world (British, European, Canadian... etc.).

== Progress ==
A European Board Examination in Neuropathology which emphasizes the importance of proper training in the neurosciences is currently being established (www.euro-cns.org). The most recent international congress of neuropathology was held in Tokyo, Japan, in September 2018.

== Journals ==
Academic neuropathology is served by several specialist neuropathology journals. Acta Neuropathologica is the neuropathology journal with the highest impact factor. Some journals are sponsored by national or international neuropathology associations: Brain Pathology is the official journal of the International Society of Neuropathology, Neuropathology & Applied Neurobiology is sponsored by the British Neuropathological Society, the Journal of Neuropathology & Experimental Neurology is the official journal of the American Association of Neuropathologists (AANP) and Neuropathology is the official journal of the Japanese Society of Neuropathology.
