= American Association of Neuropathologists =

US professional organization

American Association of Neuropathologists, Inc. was established in the 1930s as a professional and educational organization representing American neuropathologists. It was incorporated in the State of Pennsylvania in May 1960. Currently, the membership consists of 800 scientists and physicians, many of whom are international members. The AANP's expressed purpose is to advance the science and practice of neuropathology. Its official journal is the Journal of Neuropathology & Experimental Neurology.

== See also ==
- American Board of Pathology
- College of American Pathologists
- Journal of Neuropathology & Experimental Neurology
