= Cognitive neuroscience =

Study of the neural mechanisms of cognition

Cognitive neuroscience is the scientific field concerned with the study of the biological processes and aspects that underlie cognition, with a specific focus on the neural connections in the brain that are involved in mental processes. It addresses the questions of how cognitive activities are affected or controlled by neural circuits in the brain. Cognitive neuroscience is a branch of both neuroscience and psychology, overlapping with disciplines such as behavioral neuroscience, cognitive psychology, physiological psychology, and affective neuroscience. Cognitive neuroscience relies upon theories in cognitive science coupled with evidence from neurobiology, and computational modeling.

Parts of the brain play an important role in this field. Neurons play the most vital role, since the main point is to establish an understanding of cognition from a neural perspective, along with the different lobes of the cerebral cortex.

Methods employed in cognitive neuroscience include experimental procedures from psychophysics and cognitive psychology, functional neuroimaging, electrophysiology, cognitive genomics, and behavioral genetics.

Studies of patients with cognitive deficits due to brain lesions constitute an important aspect of cognitive neuroscience. The damage in lesioned brains provide a comparable starting point with regard to healthy and fully functioning brains. These damages change the neural circuits in the brain and cause it to malfunction during basic cognitive processes, such as memory or learning. These disabilities and such damage can be compared with how the healthy neural circuits are functioning, and possibly draw conclusions about the basis of the affected cognitive processes. Some examples involve damage to Wernicke's area, the left side of the temporal lobe, and Broca's area close to the frontal lobe.

Also, cognitive abilities based on brain development are studied and examined under the subfield of developmental cognitive neuroscience. This shows brain development over time, analyzing differences and proposing possible reasons for those differences.

Theoretical approaches include computational neuroscience and cognitive psychology.

== Historical origins ==
Cognitive neuroscience is an interdisciplinary area of study that has emerged from neuroscience and psychology. There are several stages in these disciplines that have changed the way researchers approached their investigations and that led to the field becoming fully established.

Although the task of cognitive neuroscience is to describe the neural mechanisms associated with the mind, historically it has progressed by investigating how a certain area of the brain supports a given mental faculty. However, early efforts to subdivide the brain proved to be problematic. The phrenologist movement failed to supply a scientific basis for its theories and has since been rejected. The aggregate field view, meaning that all areas of the brain participated in all behavior, was also rejected as a result of brain mapping, which began with Hitzig and Fritsch's experiments and eventually developed through methods such as positron emission tomography (PET) and functional magnetic resonance imaging (fMRI). Gestalt theory, neuropsychology, and the cognitive revolution were major turning points in the creation of cognitive neuroscience as a field, bringing together ideas and techniques that enabled researchers to make more links between behavior and its neural substrates.

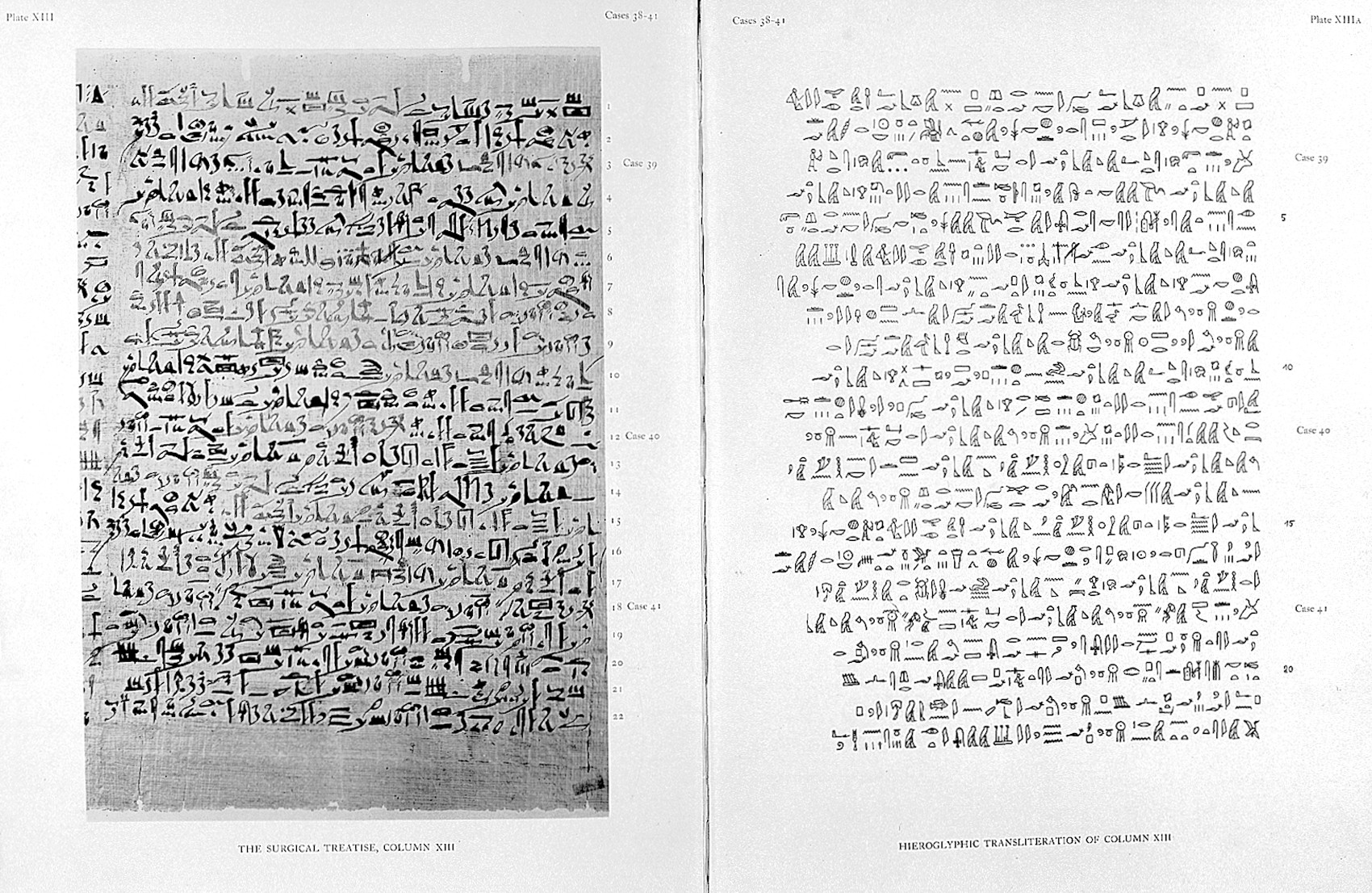
The Breasted edition (1930): left page photograph of the original papyrus, right page transcription of hieroglyphics. This is Plate XIII (column 13, case 38-41)

The connection between brain and behavior was first documented in the 16th century BC, in the Edwin Smith Papyrus of Ancient Egypt. While the Ancient Greeks Alcmaeon, Plato, Aristotle in the 5th and 4th centuries BC, and then the Roman physician Galen in the 2nd century AD already argued that the brain is the source of mental activity, scientific research into the connections between brain areas and cognitive functions began in the second half of the 19th century. The founding insights in the Cognitive neuroscience establishment were:

- In 1848, Phineas Gage became a classic subject for studying the connection between the prefrontal cortex and behavior, decision-making, and consequences when an explosion accident pierced his brain with an iron rod.
- In 1861, French neurologist Paul Broca discovered that a damaged area of the posterior inferior frontal gyrus (pars triangularis, BA45, also known as Broca's area) in patients caused an inability to speak. His work "Localization of Speech in the Third Left Frontal Cultivation" in 1865 inspired others to study brain regions linking them to sensory and motor functions.
- In 1870, German physicians Eduard Hitzig and Gustav Fritsch stimulated the cerebral cortex of a dog with electricity, causing different muscles to contract depending on the areas of the brain involved. This led to the suggestion that individual functions are localized to specific areas of the brain.
- Italian neuroanatomist professor Camillo Golgi discovered in the 1870s that nerve cells could be colored using silver nitrate allowing Golgi to argue that all the nerve cells in the nervous system are a continuous, interconnected network.
- In 1874, German neurologist and psychiatrist Carl Wernicke hypothesized an association between the left posterior section of the superior temporal gyrus and the reflexive mimicking of words and their syllables. Perhaps this was the first serious attempts to localize mental functions to specific locations in the brain. This was mostly achieved by studying the effects of injuries to different parts of the brain on psychological functions. The cases of Broca and Wernicke, which suggested that lesions caused specific behavioral changes, strongly supported the localizationist view. Additionally, Aphasia is a learning disorder which was also discovered by Paul Broca. According to, Johns Hopkins School of Medicine, Aphasia is a language disorder caused by damage in a specific area of the brain that controls language expression and comprehension. This can often lead to the person speaking words with no sense, known as "word salad"
- In 1878, Italian professor of pharmacology and physiology Angelo Mosso associated blood flow with brain functions. He invented the first neuroimaging technique, known as 'human circulation balance'. Angelo Mosso is a forerunner of more refined techniques like functional magnetic resonance imaging (fMRI) and positron emission tomography (PET).
- In 1887, Spanish neuroanatomist professor Santiago Ramón y Cajal (1852–1934) improved Golgi's method of visualizing nervous tissue under light microscopy by using a technique he termed "double impregnation". He discovered a number of facts about the organization of the nervous system: the nerve cell as an independent cell, insights into degeneration and regeneration, and ideas on brain plasticity.
- In 1894, neurologist and psychiatrist Edward Flatau published a human brain atlas "Atlas of the Human Brain and the Course of the Nerve-Fibres" which consisted of long-exposure photographs of fresh brain sections. It contained an overview of the knowledge, at that time, of the fibre pathways in the central nervous system.
- In 1909, German anatomist Korbinian Brodmann published his original research on brain mapping in the monograph Vergleichende Lokalisationslehre der Großhirnrinde (Localisation in the cerebral cortex), defining 52 distinct regions of the cerebral cortex, known as Brodmann areas based on regional variations in structure. These Brodmann areas were associated with diverse functions including sensation, motor control, and cognition.
- In 1924, German physiologist and psychiatrist Hans Berger (1873–1941) recorded the first human electroencephalogram (EEG), discovering the electrical activity of the brain (called brain waves) and, in particular, the alpha wave rhythm, which is a type of brain wave.
- A first clinical positron imaging device, a prototype of the modern Positron Emission Tomography (PET), was invented in 1953 by Dr. Brownell and Dr. Aronow. American scientists specializing in nuclear medicine David Edmund Kuhl, Luke Chapman and Roy Edwards developed this new method of tomographic imaging and constructed several tomographic instruments in the late 1950s. Ph.D. in Chemistry Michael E. Phelps was able to include their insights into the first PET scanner in 1973. PET became a valuable research tool to study brain functioning. This technique can indirectly measure radioactivity signals that indicate increased blood flow associated with increased brain activity.
- In 1971, American chemist and physicist Paul Christian Lauterbur invented the idea of MR imaging (MRI). In 2003, he received the Nobel Prize. MRI is the investigative tool for contrasting grey and white matter, which makes MRI the choice to study many conditions of the central nervous system. This method contributed to the development of Functional Magnetic Resonance Imaging (fMRI), which has been used in many studies in cognitive neuroscience since the 1990s.

== Notable perspectives ==
=== Localizationist view ===
The localizationist view was concerned with mental abilities being localized to specific areas of the brain rather than on what the characteristics of the abilities were and how to measure them. Studies performed in Europe, such as those of John Hughlings Jackson, supported this view. Jackson studied patients with brain damage, particularly those with epilepsy. He discovered that the epileptic patients often made the same clonic and tonic movements of muscle during their seizures, leading Jackson to believe that they must be caused by activity in the same place in the brain every time. Jackson proposed that specific functions were localized to specific areas of the brain, which was critical to future understanding of the brain lobes.

=== Aggregate field view ===
According to the aggregate field view, all areas of the brain participate in every mental function.

Pierre Flourens, a French experimental psychologist, challenged the localizationist view by using animal experiments. He discovered that removing the cerebellum (brain) in rabbits and pigeons affected their sense of muscular coordination, and that all cognitive functions were disrupted in pigeons when the cerebral hemispheres were removed. From this he concluded that the cerebral cortex, cerebellum, and brainstem functioned together as a whole. His approach has been criticised on the basis that the tests were not sensitive enough to notice selective deficits had they been present.

=== Mapping the brain ===
In 1870, German physicians Eduard Hitzig and Gustav Fritsch published their findings of the behavior of animals. Hitzig and Fritsch ran an electric current through the cerebral cortex of a dog, causing different muscles to contract depending on which areas of the brain were electrically stimulated. This led to the proposition that individual functions are localized to specific areas of the brain rather than the cerebrum as a whole, as the aggregate field view suggests. Brodmann was also an important figure in brain mapping; his experiments based on Franz Nissl's tissue staining techniques divided the brain into fifty-two areas.

New brain mapping technology, particularly fMRI and PET, allowed researchers to investigate experimental strategies of cognitive psychology by observing brain function. Although this is often thought of as a new method (most of the technology is relatively recent), the underlying principle goes back as far as 1878 when blood flow was first associated with brain function. Angelo Mosso, an Italian psychologist of the 19th century, had monitored the pulsations of the adult brain through neurosurgically created bony defects in the skulls of patients. He noted that when the subjects engaged in tasks such as mathematical calculations the pulsations of the brain increased locally. Such observations led Mosso to conclude that blood flow of the brain followed function.

Commonly the cerebrum is divided into 5 sections: the frontal lobe, occipital lobe, temporal lobes, parietal lobe, and the insula. The brain is also divided into fissures and sulci. The lateral sulcus called the Sylvian Fissure separates the frontal and temporal lobes. The insula is described as being deep to this lateral fissure. The longitudinal fissure separates the lobes of the brain length-wise. Lobes are considered to be distinct in their distribution of vessels. The overall surface consists of sulci and gyri which are necessary to identify for neuroimaging purposes.

=== Cognitive revolution ===
At the start of the 20th century, attitudes in America were characterized by pragmatism, which led to a preference for behaviorism as the primary approach in psychology. J.B. Watson was a key figure with his stimulus-response approach. By conducting experiments on animals he was aiming to be able to predict and control behavior. Behaviorism eventually failed because it could not provide realistic psychology of human action and thought – it focused primarily on stimulus-response associations at the expense of explaining phenomena like thought and imagination. This led to what is often termed as the "cognitive revolution".

=== Neuron doctrine ===
In the early 20th century, Santiago Ramón y Cajal and Camillo Golgi began working on the structure of the neuron. Golgi developed a silver staining method that could entirely stain several cells in a particular area, leading him to believe that neurons were directly connected with each other in one cytoplasm. Cajal challenged this view after staining areas of the brain that had less myelin and discovering that neurons were discrete cells. Cajal also discovered that cells transmit electrical signals down the neuron in one direction only. Both Golgi and Cajal were awarded a Nobel Prize in Physiology or Medicine in 1906 for this work on the neuron doctrine.

== Notable experiments ==
Throughout the history of cognitive neuroscience, many notable experiments have been conducted. For example, the mental rotation experiment conducted by Kosslyn et al., 1993, indicated that the time it takes to mentally rotate an object via imagination takes the same amount of time as actually rotating it; they found that mentally rotating an object activates parts of the brain involved in motor functioning, which may explain this similarity.

Another experiment is describes the two mechanisms of processing visual attention: bottom-up attention, and top-down attention. They define bottom-up attention is the brain visually processing salient images first, and then the surrounding information, while top-down attention involves focusing on task-relevant objects first. The researchers found that the ventral stream focuses on visual recognition, the dorsal stream is involved in the spatial information concerning the object.

As experiments in cognitive neuroscience, what these have in common is that the researchers are measuring activities or behaviors that we can see, and then determining the neural basis of the function and what part of the brain is involved.

== Emergence of a new discipline ==
=== Birth of cognitive science ===
On September 11, 1956, a large-scale meeting of cognitivists took place at the Massachusetts Institute of Technology. George A. Miller presented his "The Magical Number Seven, Plus or Minus Two" paper while Noam Chomsky and Newell & Simon presented their findings on computer science. Ulric Neisser commented on many of the findings at this meeting in his 1967 book Cognitive Psychology. The term "psychology" had been waning in the 1950s and 1960s, causing the field to be referred to as "cognitive science". Behaviorists such as Miller began to focus on the representation of language rather than general behavior. David Marr concluded that one should understand any cognitive process at three levels of analysis. These levels include computational, algorithmic/representational, and physical levels of analysis.

=== Combining neuroscience and cognitive science ===
Before the 1980s, interaction between neuroscience and cognitive science was scarce. Cognitive neuroscience began to integrate the newly laid theoretical ground in cognitive science, that emerged between the 1950s and 1960s, with approaches in experimental psychology, neuropsychology and neuroscience. (Neuroscience was not established as a unified discipline until 1971). In the late 1970s, neuroscientist Michael S. Gazzaniga and cognitive psychologist George A. Miller were said to have first coined the term "cognitive neuroscience." In the very late 20th century new technologies evolved that are now the mainstay of the methodology of cognitive neuroscience, including TMS (1985) and fMRI (1991). Earlier methods used in cognitive neuroscience include EEG (human EEG 1920) and MEG (1968). Occasionally cognitive neuroscientists utilize other brain imaging methods such as PET and SPECT. An upcoming technique in neuroscience is NIRS which uses light absorption to calculate changes in oxy- and deoxyhemoglobin in cortical areas. In some animals Single-unit recording can be used. Other methods include microneurography, facial EMG, and eye tracking. Integrative neuroscience attempts to consolidate data in databases, and form unified descriptive models from various fields and scales: biology, psychology, anatomy, and clinical practice.

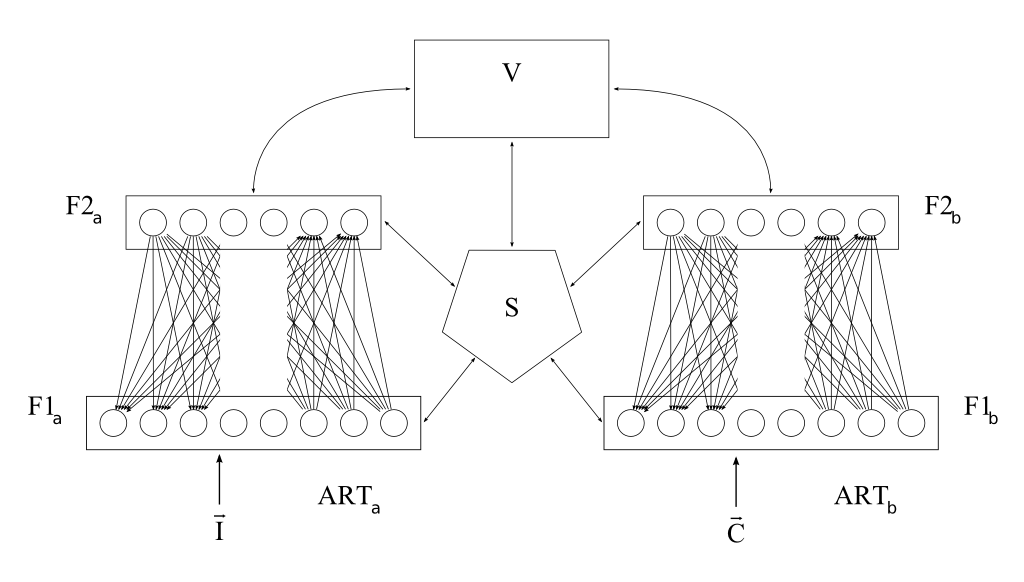
ARTMAP overview

Adaptive resonance theory (ART) is a cognitive neuroscience theory developed by Gail Carpenter and Stephen Grossberg in the late 1970s on aspects of how the brain processes information. It describes a number of artificial neural network models which use supervised and unsupervised learning methods, and address problems such as pattern recognition and prediction.

In 2014, Stanislas Dehaene, Giacomo Rizzolatti and Trevor Robbins, were awarded the Brain Prize "for their pioneering research on higher brain mechanisms underpinning such complex human functions as literacy, numeracy, motivated behaviour and social cognition, and for their efforts to understand cognitive and behavioural disorders". Brenda Milner, Marcus Raichle and John O'Keefe received the Kavli Prize in Neuroscience "for the discovery of specialized brain networks for memory and cognition" and O'Keefe shared the Nobel Prize in Physiology or Medicine in the same year with May-Britt Moser and Edvard Moser "for their discoveries of cells that constitute a positioning system in the brain".

In 2017, Wolfram Schultz, Peter Dayan and Ray Dolan were awarded the Brain Prize "for their multidisciplinary analysis of brain mechanisms that link learning to reward, which has far-reaching implications for the understanding of human behaviour, including disorders of decision-making in conditions such as gambling, drug addiction, compulsive behaviour and schizophrenia".,

== Recent trends ==
Recently the focus of research has expanded from the localization of brain area(s) for specific functions in the adult brain using a single technology. Studies have been diverging in several different directions: exploring the interactions between different brain areas, using multiple technologies and approaches to understand brain functions, and using computational approaches. Advances in non-invasive functional neuroimaging and associated data analysis methods have also made it possible to use highly naturalistic stimuli and tasks such as feature films depicting social interactions in cognitive neuroscience studies.

In recent years, there have been a lot of new advancements in the field of Cognitive Neuroscience. One new technique that has emerged is called shadow imaging. This method has combined different aspects of various neuroimaging techniques to create one that is more versatile. It uses standard light microscopy and melds it with fluorescence labeling of the interstitial fluid in the brain's extracellular space. This technique can help researchers get a bigger and more detailed look at brain tissue and can help researchers understand more on anatomy and viability for their experiments. This technique has helped to see neurons, microglia, tumor cells and blood capillaries more closely. Shadow imaging is a new approach that shows a lot of promise in the field of neuroimaging.

Another very recent trend in cognitive neuroscience is the use of optogenetics to explore circuit function and its behavioral consequences. This new technology is a combination of genetic targeting of certain neurons and use of the imaging technology to see these targets in living neurons. This technique allows scientists to see the neurons while they are still intact in animals and be able to trace the electrical phenomena in that cell. This new technology has been used successfully in many experiments and it is helping researchers in observing brain activity and understanding its role in disease, behavior and function.

Researchers have also modified a fMRI machine and made it more efficient, in a technique called direct imaging of neuronal activity or DIANA. This group of researchers changed the software to collect data every 5 milliseconds, which is 8 times faster than what the normal technique captures. Afterwards, the software can stitch together all of the images taken during the imaging and create a full slice of the brain.

In 2024, Prof. of bioengineering Igor Val Danilov introduced the natural neurostimulation hypothesis that explains the neuromodulation mechanism during pregnancy. Because the natural neurostimulation contributes to developing a healthy nervous system during pregnancy, artificial neurostimulation with the physical characteristics of a mother's care for her fetus scaled to the parameters of the specific patient can treat the injured nervous system. Based on this insight, the novel APIN neurostimulation technique was introduced. The APIN technique exerts its neurotherapeutic effect by inducing mitochondrial stress and microvascular vasodilation of the specific neuronal circuits during an intensive cognitive load.

=== Cognitive Neuroscience and Artificial Intelligence ===
Cognitive neuroscience has played a major role in shaping artificial intelligence (AI). By studying how the human brain processes information, researchers have developed AI systems that simulate cognitive functions like learning, pattern recognition, and decision-making. A good example of this is neural networks, which are inspired by the connections between neurons in the brain. These networks form the foundation of many AI applications.

Deep learning, a subfield of AI, uses neural networks to replicate processes similar to those in the human brain. For instance, convolutional neural networks (CNNs) are modeled after the visual system and have transformed tasks like image recognition and speech analysis. AI also benefits from advancements in brain imaging technologies, such as functional magnetic resonance imaging (fMRI) and electroencephalography (EEG). These tools provide valuable insights into neural activity, which help improve AI systems designed to mimic human thought processes.

Despite the progress, replicating the complexity of human cognition remains a challenge. Researchers are now exploring hybrid models that combine neural networks with symbolic reasoning to better mimic how humans think and solve problems. This approach shows promise for addressing some of the limitations of current AI systems.

== Topics ==
- Attention
- Cognitive development
- Consciousness
- Creativity
- Decision-making
- Emotions
- Intelligence
- Language
- Learning
- Memory
- Perception
- Social cognition
- Mind Wandering

== Methods ==
Experimental methods include:

- Psychophysics
- Eye-tracking
- Functional magnetic resonance imaging
- Electroencephalography
- Magnetoencephalography
- Electrocorticography
- Transcranial Magnetic Stimulation
- Computational Modeling

== Notable people ==
- Jesper Mogensen, Danish neuroscientist and former university professor
- Brenda Milner, Canadian neuropsychologist and pioneer of memory research
- May-Britt Moser, Norwegian neuroscientist and Nobel Prize winner
- Gail Carpenter, American cognitive neuroscientist and mathematician
- Karl Friston, British neuroscientist and Fellow of the Royal Society

== See also ==
- Binding problem
- Cognitive biology
- Cognitive psychology
- Embodied cognition
- Experimental psychology
- Cognitive psychophysiology
- Affective neuroscience
- Social neuroscience
- Social cognitive neuroscience
- Cultural neuroscience
- List of cognitive neuroscientists
- Neurochemistry
- Neuroethology
- Neuroendocrinology
- Neuroscience

== Sources ==
- Bear, Mark F.; Connors, Barry W.; Paradiso, Michael A. (2007). Neuroscience. Lippincott Williams & Wilkins. ISBN 978-0-7817-6003-4.
- Kosslyn, Stephen Michael; Andersen, Richard A., eds. (1995). Frontiers in Cognitive Neuroscience. MIT Press. ISBN 978-0-262-61110-7.
