= James Crichton-Browne =

British psychiatrist, neurologist, and eugenicist (1840–1938)

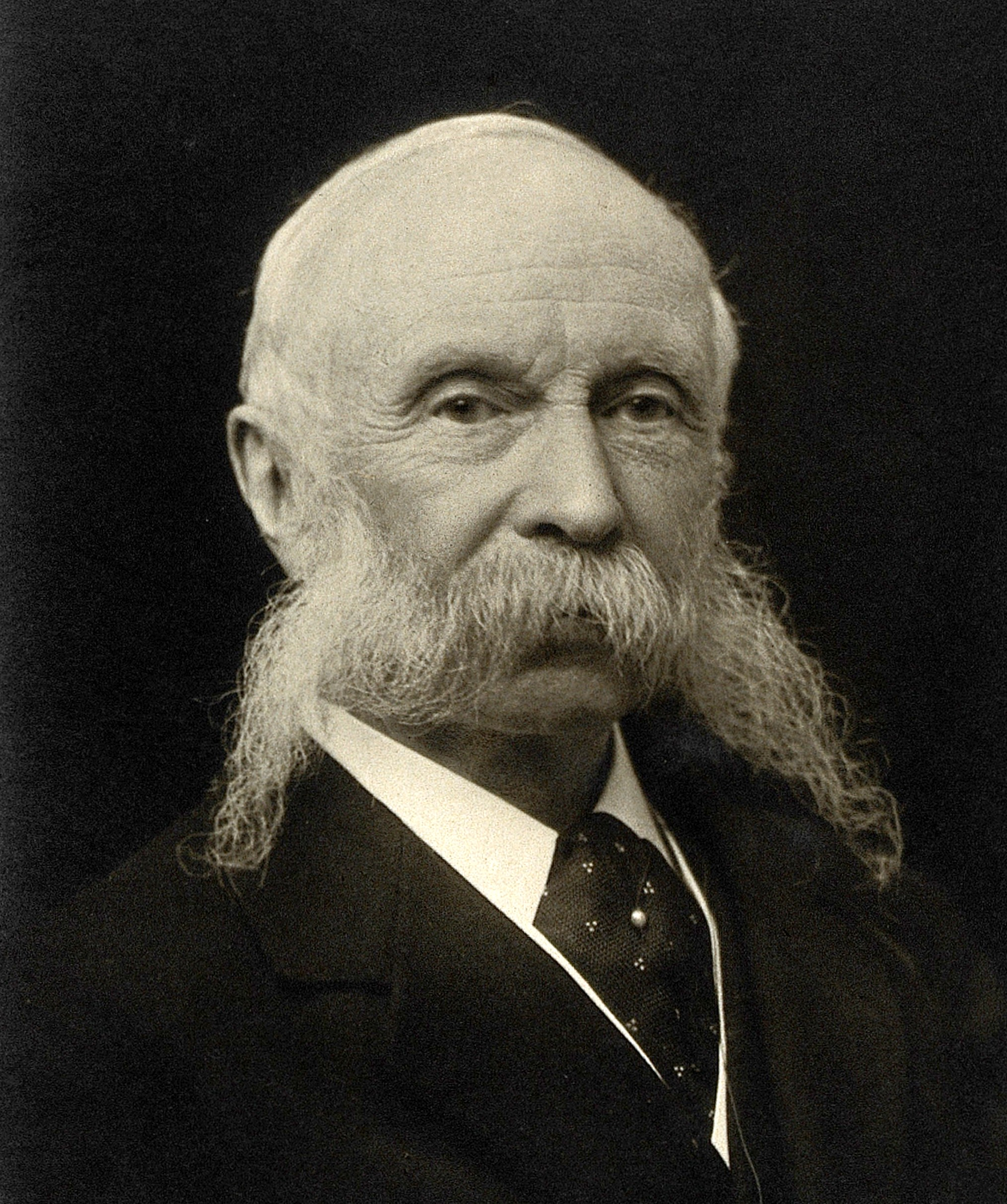
- Born: 29 November 1840; Edinburgh, Scotland
- Died: 31 January 1938 (aged 97); Dumfries, Scotland
- Education: Edinburgh University
- Known for: Functional specialization (brain), cerebral asymmetry, biological psychiatry, medical history, photography, memoirist
- Scientific career
- Fields: psychiatry, public health, medical psychology
- Workplaces: Royal Medical Society, West Riding Pauper Lunatic Asylum, Court of Chancery, Medico-Psychological Association, Royal Institution, Royal Society

Sir James Crichton-Browne FRS FRSE (29 November 1840 – 31 January 1938) was a leading Scottish psychiatrist, neurologist and eugenicist. He is known for studies on the relationship of mental illness to brain injury and for the development of public health policies in relation to mental health. Crichton-Browne's father was the asylum reformer Dr William A.F. Browne, a prominent member of the Edinburgh Phrenological Society and, from 1838 until 1857, the superintendent of the Crichton Royal at Dumfries where Crichton-Browne spent much of his childhood.

Crichton-Browne edited the highly influential West Riding Lunatic Asylum Medical Reports (six volumes, 1871–76). He was one of Charles Darwin's leading collaborators – on The Expression of the Emotions in Man and Animals (1872) – and, like Duchenne de Boulogne (at the Salpêtrière in Paris) and Hugh Welch Diamond in Surrey, was a pioneer of neuropsychiatric photography. He based himself at the West Riding Lunatic Asylum in Wakefield from 1866 to 1875, and there he taught psychiatry to students from the nearby Leeds School of Medicine and, with David Ferrier, transformed the asylum into a world centre for neuropsychology. Crichton-Browne then served as Lord Chancellor's Visitor from 1875 till 1922. Throughout his career, Crichton-Browne emphasised the asymmetrical aspects of the human brain and behaviour; and also, like Emil Kraepelin and Alois Alzheimer, he made some influential predictions about the neurological changes associated with severe psychiatric disorders. Crichton-Browne was also a forceful advocate of eugenics, and in 1908 became the first president of the Eugenics Education Society.

In 1920, Crichton-Browne delivered the first Maudsley Lecture to the Medico-Psychological Association in the course of which he outlined his recollections of Henry Maudsley; and in the last fifteen years of his life, he published seven volumes of reminiscences. In 2015, UNESCO listed Crichton-Browne's clinical papers and photographs (about 5000 items in all) as items of international cultural importance.

== Family background and education 1840–1866 ==
Crichton-Browne was born in Edinburgh at the family home of his mother, Magdalene Howden Balfour. She was the daughter of Dr Andrew Balfour and belonged to one of Scotland's foremost scientific families. The Balfour home (at St John's Hill near Salisbury Crags) had been constructed in 1770 for the unmarried geologist James Hutton (1726–1797) who was Magdalene Balfour's great-uncle. Crichton-Browne's father, the asylum reformer William A. F. Browne (1805–1885), was a prominent phrenologist and his younger brother, John Hutton Balfour-Browne KC (1845–1921), wrote a classic account of the legal relations of insanity.

Crichton-Browne spent much of his childhood at The Crichton Royal in Dumfries, where his father was the medical superintendent from 1838 to 1857. William A. F. Browne was a pioneering Victorian psychiatrist and an exponent of moral treatment with an interest in the psychological lives of his patients as illustrated by their group activities, dreams and art-works. W. A. F. Browne also hoarded a huge collection of patient art and this interest found a parallel in Crichton-Browne's later asylum photography. In his childhood, Crichton-Browne lost an older brother, William (aged 11) in 1846. He went to school at Dumfries Academy and then, in line with his mother's episcopalian outlook, to Glenalmond College. Shortly before his death, Crichton-Browne wrote a valuable account of his Dumfries childhood, including the visit of the American asylum reformer Dorothea Lynde Dix.

Crichton-Browne studied medicine at Edinburgh University, qualifying as an MD in 1862 with a thesis on hallucinations. Among his teachers was his father's friend Thomas Laycock (1812–1876) whose magnum opus Mind and Brain is an extended speculative essay on neurology and psychological life. Crichton-Browne also drew on the writings of the physicians Sir Andrew Halliday and Sir Henry Holland. Like his father, Crichton-Browne was elected one of the undergraduate Presidents of the Royal Medical Society and, in this capacity, he argued for the place of psychology in the medical curriculum. In 1863, he visited a number of asylums in Paris (including the Salpêtrière), and after working as assistant physician at asylums in Exeter (with John Charles Bucknill), Warwick and Derby, and a brief period on Tyneside, Crichton-Browne was appointed physician-superintendent of the West Riding Pauper Lunatic Asylum at Wakefield in 1866. This was also the year in which his father served as the president of the Medico-Psychological Association (now the Royal College of Psychiatrists).

== Ferrier, Darwin and the West Riding Asylum Reports 1866–1875 ==
Ferrier's neurology: Crichton-Browne spent almost ten years at the West Riding Asylum. He believed that the asylum should be an educational as well as a therapeutic institution and set about a major research programme, bringing biological insights to bear on the causes of insanity. He supervised hundreds of post-mortem examinations of the brain and took a special interest in the clinical features of neurosyphilis. In 1872, Crichton-Browne developed his father's phrenological theories by inviting the Scottish neurologist David Ferrier (1843–1928) to direct the asylum laboratories and to conduct studies on the cortical localization of cerebral functions. (In 1832–34, William A. F. Browne had published a paper in the Phrenological Journal on language centres in the brain and in his later writings there is a reiterated emphasis on the relationships of brain injury, psychosis and language). Ferrier's work at Wakefield transformed the asylum into a world centre for neuropsychiatry and he summarised his research in the neurological classic The Functions of the Brain (1876).

Darwin's correspondence: At the instigation of Henry Maudsley (1835–1918), Crichton-Browne corresponded with Charles Darwin from May 1869 until December 1875. The bulk of the correspondence occurred during the preparation of Crichton-Browne's famous West Riding Lunatic Asylum Medical Reports and of Darwin's The Expression of the Emotions in Man and Animals. On 8 June 1869, Darwin sent Crichton-Browne his copy of Duchenne's Mechanism of Human Facial Expression, asking for his comments. Crichton-Browne seems to have mislaid the book for almost a year at the Wakefield asylum; but, on 6 June 1870, he returned it with considerable embarrassment, and enclosed the one psychiatric photograph which Darwin used in his book (see below). Darwin explored a huge range of subjects with Crichton-Browne, including references to Maudsley's Body and Mind, the psychology of blushing, the bristling of hair, the functions of the platysma muscle (Darwin's "bête noire"), and the clinical phenomena of bereavement and grief. Darwin's mysterious symptoms which included vomiting, sweating, sighing, and weeping, particularly troublesome in the early months of 1872, seem to have improved around the time that he completed his work on the emotions. Interestingly, Crichton-Browne declined Henry Maudsley's invitation to review The Descent of Man for The Journal of Mental Science; and it is notable that Darwin did not make a contribution to Crichton-Browne's Asylum Reports, nor did he visit the Wakefield Asylum when invited by Crichton-Browne in 1873.

"April 20th 1882 – Charles Darwin has passed away, and with him I have lost a friend, illustrious and kind. Recalling my delightful intercourse with him, I pick out of a sheaf of letters one showing, as indeed they all do, the scrupulous care with which his inquiries were conducted, his marvellous suggestiveness, and his generous acknowledgement of any help given to him." James Crichton-Browne, in What the Doctor Thought (1930), page 61.

Mental Science: Building on the early asylum photography of Hugh Welch Diamond (1809 -1886) at Brookwood Hospital, Crichton-Browne sent about forty photographs of patients to Charles Darwin during the composition of his The Expression of the Emotions; however, Darwin used only one of these in the book (Figure 19) and this (Darwin Correspondence Project Letter 7220) was of a patient under the care of Dr James Gilchrist in the public wing of Crichton Royal at Dumfries. The complete correspondence between Crichton-Browne and Charles Darwin forms a remarkable contribution to the beginnings of behavioural science. Nevertheless, Crichton-Browne attached greater importance to his six volumes of West Riding Lunatic Asylum Medical Reports (1871–1876) – sending Darwin a copy of Volume One on 18 August 1871 – and to the neurological journal Brain which developed from them, in which he was assisted by John Hughlings Jackson (1835–1911).

In 1875, Crichton-Browne criticised the classification of mental disorders advocated by the Edinburgh psychiatrist David Skae (1814–1873) which had been promoted by Skae's pupil Thomas Clouston (1840–1915); Skae sought to associate specific kinds of mental illness with variously disordered bodily organs. Crichton-Browne described it as: "philosophically unsound, scientifically inaccurate and practically useless".

In 1879, Crichton-Browne published his own considerations of the neuropathology of insanity making some detailed predictions about the morbid anatomy of the brain in cases of severe psychiatric disorder. He proposed that, in the insane, the weight of the brain was reduced, that the lateral ventricles were enlarged, and that the burden of damage fell on the left cerebral hemisphere. These observations - made almost a century before the introduction of neuroleptics - involved an evolutionary view of cerebral localisation with an emphasis on the asymmetry of cerebral functions. He derived this from the clinical research of the French anatomist Paul Broca (1824–1880) on language centres in the brain – originally published in 1861 – and presented by Broca to the British Association for the Advancement of Science at its 1868 meeting in Norwich. The question of asymmetrical cerebral functions had been raised many years earlier by the Edinburgh phrenologist Hewett Cottrell Watson in the Phrenological Journal. Crichton-Browne's own views on psychosis and cerebral asymmetry have been appraised by Crow, 1995 and Compston, 2007.

== Lord Chancellor's Visitor in Lunacy 1875–1922 ==
In 1875, Crichton-Browne was appointed as Lord Chancellor's Medical Visitor in Lunacy, a position which involved the regular examination of wealthy Chancery patients throughout England and Wales. He held this post until his retirement in 1922 and he combined it with the development of an extensive London consulting practice, becoming a familiar figure on the metropolitan medical scene. In 1878, he followed his father as president of the Medico-Psychological Association. In 1883, he was elected a Fellow of the Royal Society; and he served as treasurer and vice-president of the Royal Institution from 1889 until 1926. Crichton-Browne also made friendships in the literary world with the idiosyncratic historian Thomas Carlyle (1795–1881) whose marital reputation he defended against the allegations of James Anthony Froude; and, less controversially, with his exact contemporary, the novelist Thomas Hardy (1840–1928) who — concerned about his wife's health — consulted Crichton-Browne about the peculiarities of the female brain. Hardy presented Crichton-Browne with an inscribed copy of his Wessex Poems in 1898.

Crichton-Browne was a notable stylist and orator, and he often combined this with a kind of couthy vernacular evocative of his Dumfries childhood. He served as President of the Dumfriesshire and Galloway Natural History and Antiquarian Society from 1892 to 1896. In Dumfries, on 24 January 1895, he gave a remarkable and light-hearted Presidential lecture- On Emotional Expression – in which he discussed some reservations about Darwin's views, and touched on the role of the motor cortex in expression, on the relations of gender to expressive asymmetry, and on the relationship of language to the physical expression of the emotions. A few months later, on 30 June 1895 in London, Crichton-Browne delivered his famous Cavendish Lecture On Dreamy Mental States, in which he explored the relationship of trauma in the uniquely vulnerable temporal lobes to déjà vu, hallucinatory, and supernatural experiences; this caught the attention of William James (1842–1910), who referred – rather dismissively – to Crichton-Browne in his Gifford lectures on The Varieties of Religious Experience (delivered in Edinburgh in 1901–02):

Sir James Crichton-Browne has given the technical name of "dreamy states" to these sudden invasions of vaguely reminiscent consciousness. They bring a sense of mystery and of the metaphysical duality of things, and the feeling of an enlargement of perception which seems imminent, but which never completes itself. In Dr Crichton-Browne's opinion they connect themselves with the perplexed and scared disturbances of self-consciousness which occasionally precede epileptic attacks. I think that this learned alienist takes a rather absurdly alarmist view of an intrinsically insignificant phenomenon. He follows it along the downward ladder, to insanity... William James (1902) The Varieties of Religious Experience – The Gifford Lectures on Natural Religion: Lecture 16: Mysticism.

In the early years of the 20th century, Crichton-Browne delivered a number of lectures on the asymmetry of the human brain, publishing his conclusions in 1907.

== President of the Sanitary Inspectors' Association 1901–1921 ==
Crichton-Browne was elected and re-elected President of the Sanitary Inspectors' Association on an unprecedented twenty occasions. Like his predecessors, Sir Edwin Chadwick, and Sir Benjamin Ward Richardson, he took a close interest in the affairs of the Association. He greatly assisted the Association's negotiations with the Local Government Board (predecessor of the Ministry of Health) in its attempts to secure the improved education and training of sanitary inspectors. These attempts faced opposition from some sectors of the medical profession which viewed the rise of the sanitary inspectors as a threat to Medical Officers of Health. He was regarded with much affection and respect by the sanitary inspectors and he was a frequently invited speaker at their conferences and dinners — although his speeches could be repetitive and lengthy.

In 1914, on being re-elected for a further term as President, he responded:

"I am an old man; I feel I ought to make way for someone who might be more energetic —" — cries of 'No, No!' from the Conference — " — one who might better represent your interests —" — 'No, No!' — " — But I am somewhat reconciled to holding office a little longer by discovering that John Fisher, who has just become First Sea Lord, is exactly the same age that I am. If he is capable of directing the energies of our Fleets, then I think I am capable of presiding over you!" — Loud Cheers!

— The Sanitary Journal, November 1914, 10, No. 6, p. 107

== Elder statesman of mental science 1920–1938 ==
In the early Summer of 1920, Crichton-Browne delivered the first Maudsley Lecture to the Royal Medico-Psychological Association, giving a generous tribute to Henry Maudsley whose enthusiasm and energy in the 1860s had been a source of inspiration to Crichton-Browne.

Four years later, on 29 February 1924, Crichton-Browne gave the Ramsay Henderson Bequest Lecture in Edinburgh: The Story of the Brain. In this, he delivered a tribute to members of the Edinburgh Phrenological Society: to George Combe (1788–1858) author of The Constitution of Man (1828), to Andrew Combe (1797–1847) author of Observations on Mental Derangement (1831), and to Robert Chambers (1802–1871) who had sought to combine phrenology with evolutionary Lamarckism in his Vestiges of the Natural History of Creation – written in St Andrews as Chambers recuperated from depression, and published in 1844. Chambers simply inverted Hutton's aphorism "no vestige of a beginning". However, Crichton-Browne did not mention that his Henderson lecture was delivered a century (almost to the day) after his father had joined the Edinburgh Phrenological Society.

With increasing age and the death of his first wife (Emily Halliday; following her death in 1903, Crichton-Browne married Audrey Emily Bulwer in 1912), and with the loss of two grandsons in the first world war, Crichton-Browne's rhetoric took on a more strident tone and his engagement with eugenics tarnished his reputation in the last two decades of his life.

== Death ==
He died, following a fall and suffering from heart failure, in Dumfries on 31 January 1938. He was predeceased by his son Colonel Harold Crichton-Browne (1866–1937).

== Positions held ==
- Elected a Fellow of the Royal Society of Edinburgh (1870)
- Elected a Fellow of the Royal Society (1883)
- Knighted by Queen Victoria (1886)
- President of the Medico-Psychological Association
- President of the Neurological Society
- President of the Medical Society of London
- President of the National Health Society
- Treasurer and vice-president of the Royal Institution
- President of the Eugenics Education Society

== Legacy ==
Medical Psychology: Crichton-Browne often described himself as a medical psychologist, but in spite of the pervasive influence of his West Riding Lunatic Asylum Medical Reports, he remains a rather shadowy figure in the history of British neuroscience. However, his unusual longevity, taken together with his father's distinguished psychiatric career, brought the world of the Edinburgh phrenologists into contact with developing neuroscience in the course of the 20th century; and Crichton-Browne's considerations of the cerebral basis of psychotic disorder were well ahead of their time. His collaboration with David Ferrier on cerebral localisation, and the development of the journal Brain, give him a central role in early British neurology; and his protracted correspondence with Charles Darwin - over a period of several years - highlights the mutual engagement of psychiatry and evolutionary theory in the later nineteenth century. In 2015, UNESCO listed Crichton-Browne's clinical papers and photographs as items of international cultural importance.

Social Policy: Very early in his career, Crichton-Browne stressed the importance of psychiatric disorders in childhood and, much later, he was to emphasise the distinction between organic and functional illness in the elderly. He was considered an expert in many aspects of psychological medicine, public health and social reform. He supported a campaign for the open-air treatment of tuberculosis, housing and sanitary reform, and a practical approach to sexually transmitted diseases. He condemned the corporal punishment of children. He stressed the importance of the asymmetric lateralization of brain function in the development of language, and deplored the fads relating to ambidexterity advocated by (among others) Robert Baden-Powell. He was critical of public education systems for their repetitive and fact-bound character, warning of mental exhaustion ("overpressure") in otherwise happy and healthy children. He was openly – even offensively – sceptical concerning the claims of psychic investigators (including Frederic William Henry Myers) and spiritualists, (see The Times articles of 1897/1899 concerning the Ballechin House controversy), and of dietary faddists and vegetarians. He argued that the therapeutic benefits of Freudian psychotherapy had been assessed with insufficient rigour. He advocated the fluoridation of human dietary intake in 1892, and recommended prenatal fluoride. He worried about the consequences of mass transportation by motor vehicles.

Retirement: In his later years, Crichton-Browne enjoyed lengthy interludes at the Dumfries home ("Crindau", on the River Nith) which he had inherited from his father. Here, he worked on a number of projects, including a notable study of Robert Burns' medical problems, and seven volumes of memoirs, drawing on his personal commonplace notebooks, and ranging widely over medical, psychological, biographical and Scottish themes. These notebooks provide a unique psychiatric commentary on later Victorian culture and society.

Crichton-Browne was twice married and, like his mother, cherished a lifelong affection for the traditions of the Anglican liturgy; he was a loyal member of the congregation at the Church of St John the Evangelist, Dumfries. Through his granddaughter Sybil Cookson, he became friendly with the painter Gluck (1895–1978) who created an arresting portrait of Sir James in 1928, now in the National Portrait Gallery. Also in the National Portrait Gallery is a 1917 photographic portrait by Walter Stoneman. Another portrait by Sir Oswald Birley, painted in 1934, is in the Crichton Royal Collection in Dumfries. Crichton-Browne was elected a Fellow of The Royal Society in 1883 with posthumous support from Charles Darwin, and he was knighted in 1886. At his death on 31 January 1938 at the age of 97, Crichton-Browne – like Robert Burns, Thomas Carlyle and James Clerk Maxwell – was acclaimed as one of the greatest sons of South-West Scotland; as one of the last men in Britain to sport Dundreary whiskers – and as one of the last Victorians.

== See also ==
- Crichton-Browne sign
- Council housing
- Gustav Fritsch
- Eduard Hitzig
- Teleology
- Eugenics
