= Itzig =

Itzig may refer to:

- The Itzig family, famous for its contribution to Jewish and German cultural history
  - Julius Eduard Hitzig, born Isaac Elias Itzig
- Itzig, Luxembourg (Hesperingen)

== See also ==
- Hitzig
