= Masud Husain =

British professor and editor

Masud Husain FRCP FRS FMedSci
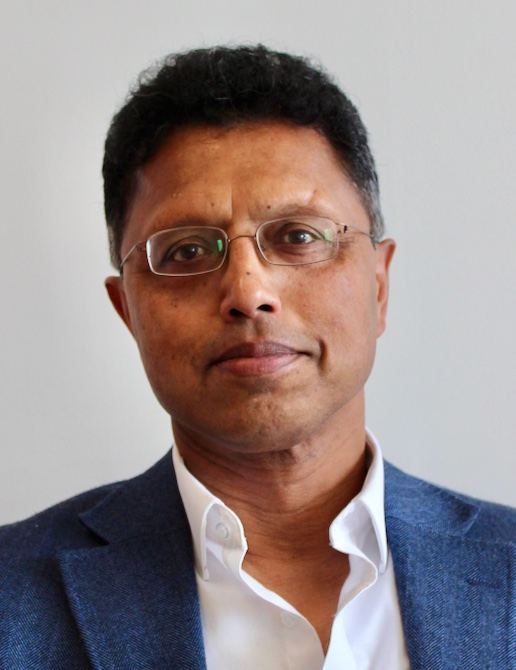
- Husain in 2023
- Born: Masud Husain
- Education: King Edward VI Camp Hill School for Boys
- Alma mater: University of Oxford (BMBCh, DPhil)
- Awards: Harkness Fellowship; Wellcome Trust Principal Research Fellowship (2012)
- Scientific career
- Fields: Cognitive neurology Working memory Apathy; Alzheimer's disease Parkinson's disease
- Institutions: University of Oxford; Imperial College London; University College London; Massachusetts Institute of Technology
- Thesis: On hemispheric specialisation and visual direction sense (1987)
- Website: www.masudhusain.org

Masud Husain FRS FRCP FMedSci is a clinical neurologist and neuroscientist at the University of Oxford. He is Professor of Neurology & Cognitive Neuroscience at the Nuffield Department of Clinical Neurosciences and Departmental of Experimental Psychology, University of Oxford, a Professorial Fellow at New College, Oxford, and Editor-in-Chief of the journal Brain. Husain's book Our Brains, Our Selves won the Royal Society Trivedi Best Science Book Prize, 2025. He was born in East Pakistan, now Bangladesh.

== Education ==
Husain was educated at King Edward VI Camp Hill School for Boys, Birmingham, and studied medicine at the University of Oxford where he was a student at New College, Oxford and received a Bachelor of Medicine, Bachelor of Surgery (BMBCh) degree followed by a DPhil in 1987.

== Research and career ==
Husain held a Harkness Fellowship as a postdoctoral fellow in the laboratory of Richard A. Andersen at Massachusetts Institute of Technology (MIT). He completed his clinical and neurological training at hospitals in Oxford and London.

Husain's research focuses on cognitive functions in people with neurological diseases and healthy people.

In an editorial in 2025, Husain criticised the rise of bullshit jobs in Universities in the United Kingdom.

=== Attention and inattention ===
His work on people with hemispatial neglect following stroke demonstrated several novel components of this syndrome. Using the attentional blink paradigm he showed that there were non-spatial, selective attention deficits in these patients, in addition to their well-established directional attentional bias. Subsequent behavioural studies revealed that some people with hemispatial neglect can also suffer from impaired spatial working memory, often revisiting locations without being aware that they have fixated them before. Some may have poor sustained attention as measured on vigilance tasks, or even directional motor deficits as indexed by paradigms where the spatial location of a visual target is dissociated from direction of movement required to reach it. These findings provided further evidence for neglect being a multi-component syndrome, with different patients having different deficits, depending upon the extent of their lesion. Critical brain regions associated with neglect that were identified by this work, included the right inferior posterior parietal and frontal regions. Experimental medicine studies by Husain's group using the dopamine agonist rotigotine and the noradrenergic agonist guanfacine demonstrated that these drugs can ameliorate hemispatial neglect to some extent by improving attention.

=== Visual short-term or working memory ===
By using new methods to measure the precision of recall in healthy people, work in Husain's lab challenged the view that capacity of visual short-term memory or working memory is limited to a fixed number of items. Instead, this research revealed that although short-term memory is a highly limited resource, it can be flexibly deployed depending upon task demands. This work led to the application of new methods to measure short-term memory in patients with Alzheimer's disease, Parkinson's disease and individuals at risk of developing these conditions. The techniques that have been developed can provide more sensitive ways to measure short-term memory than traditional methods. They have also revealed how different mechanisms might underlie short-term memory disorders in different neurological conditions.

=== Motivation, apathy and initiation of action ===
Work from Husain's lab showed that lesions to ventral basal ganglia leads to a condition of profound apathy, manifest as a lack of motivation to initiate action and specifically attributable to a deficit in reward sensitivity. Using the dopamine receptor agonist ropinirole, it was possible to improve reward sensitivity, restore motivational vigour and reverse apathy. These observations stimulated larger-scale studies in Parkinson's disease, a condition associated with basal ganglia pathology and often debilitating apathy. The syndrome of pathological apathy in Parkinson's disease and small vessel cerebrovascular disease was found to be characterised by reduced sensitivity to rewards, a deficit that could be ameliorated by dopaminergic drugs in Parkinson's disease. This has led to a theoretical framework to understand mechanisms underlying apathy across brain disorders which incorporates concepts from cost-benefit decision making to formalise how people differ in their willingness to engage in effort in order to obtain potential rewards.

The basal ganglia are considered to be essential for linking motivation to action systems. Outputs of the basal ganglia are strongly connected to medial frontal cortex. Husain's group identified a mechanism that resolves competition between conflicting action plans, in medial frontal brain regions, including the supplementary eye field, supplementary motor area and pre-supplementary motor area. A key component of voluntary control paradoxically appears to involve inhibition of unwanted actions that are primed automatically by seeing objects around us. This control is lost following supplementary motor area and pre-supplementary motor area lesions. Findings from lesion, stimulation and physiological studies were incorporated to provide a new theoretical framework for the role of the supplementary motor area and pre-supplementary motor area complex.

=== Awards and honours ===
Husain held a Wellcome Trust Senior Research Fellowship at Imperial College London (2000-2007) and University College London (UCL) (2007–12). He was awarded a Wellcome Trust Principal Research Fellowship (2012-2023) and elected Fellow of the Academy of Medical Sciences (FMedSci) in 2008. Husain was awarded the Graham Bull Prize in Clinical Science by the Royal College of Physicians in 2006, British Neuropsychological Society's Elizabeth Warrington Prize (2006), and the European Academy of Neurology Investigator Award (2016). He is Fellow of the American Academy of Neurology (2018) and Fellow of the European Academy of Neurology (2018), and is co-lead of the National Institute for Health and Care Research (NIHR) Oxford Health Biomedical Research Centre Dementia theme (2022 -) and Dementia Research Oxford at the University of Oxford. He was elected a Fellow of the Royal Society in 2026.
