= David Ferrier =

Scottish neurologist and psychologist (1843–1928)

Sir David Ferrier
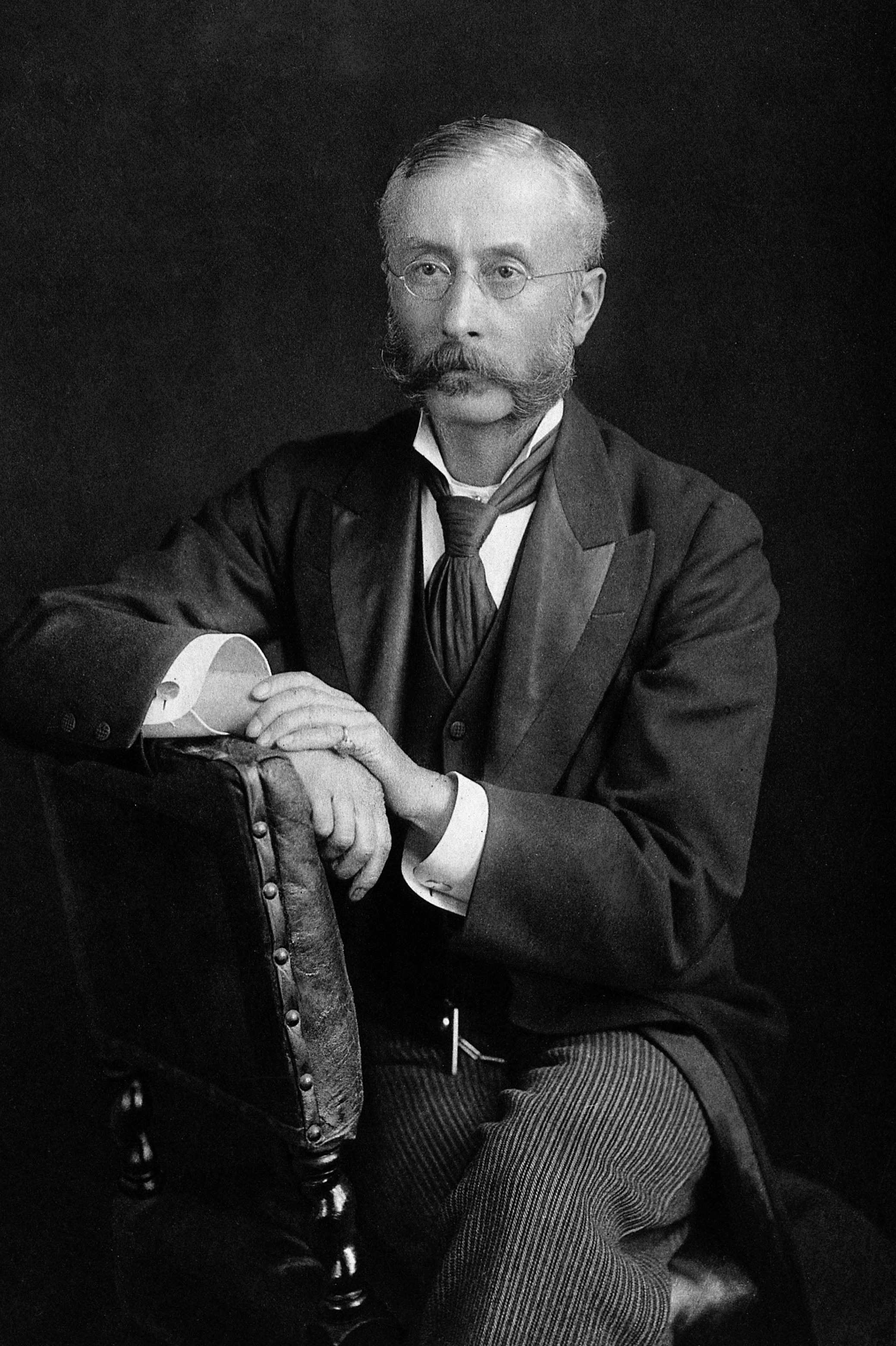
- Born: 13 January 1843
- Died: 19 March 1928 (aged 85)
- Awards: Cameron Prize for Therapeutics of the University of Edinburgh (1891)

Sir David Ferrier FRS (13 January 1843 – 19 March 1928) was a pioneering Scottish neurologist and psychologist. Ferrier conducted experiments on the brains of animals such as monkeys and in 1881 became the first scientist to be prosecuted under the Cruelty to Animals Act, 1876 which had been enacted following a major public debate over vivisection.

== Life ==
Ferrier was born in Woodside, Aberdeen, the sixth child of David and Hannah; he was educated at Aberdeen Grammar School before studying for an MA at Aberdeen University (graduating in Classics in 1863), before studying psychophysiology in Germany and medicine at Edinburgh. As a medical student, he began to work as a scientific assistant to the influential free-thinking philosopher and psychologist Alexander Bain (1818–1903), one of the founders of associative psychology.

Around 1860, psychology was finding its scientific foundation mainly in Germany, with the rigorous research of Hermann von Helmholtz (1821–1894), who had trained as a physicist, and of Wilhelm Wundt (1832–1920). They focused their work mainly in the area of sensory psychophysics. Both worked at the University of Heidelberg. In 1864, Bain prompted Ferrier to spend some time in their laboratories.

On returning to Scotland, Ferrier graduated in medicine in 1868 at the University of Edinburgh; his thesis was on the anatomy and structure of the Corpora quadrigemina and it won a gold medal. A few years later, in 1870, he moved into London and started work as a neuropathologist at the King's College Hospital and at the National Hospital for Paralysis and Epilepsy, Queen Square. The latter—now the National Hospital for Neurology and Neurosurgery—was the first hospital in England to be dedicated to the treatment of neurological diseases and has a David Ferrier ward named in his memory.

At that period, the great neurologist John Hughlings Jackson (1835–1911) worked in the same hospital as Ferrier. Jackson was refining his concepts of the sensorimotor functions of the nervous system, derived from clinical experience. Jackson proposed that there was an anatomical and physiological substrate for the localization of brain functions, which was hierarchically organized.

Influenced by Jackson who became his mentor, Ferrier decided to embark on an experimental program. It aimed to extend the results of two German physiologists, Eduard Hitzig (1838–1907) and Gustav Fritsch (1837–1927).

In 1870, they had published results on localized electrical stimulation of the motor cortex in dogs. Ferrier wanted also to test Jackson's idea that epilepsy had a cortical origin, as it was suggested by his clinical observations.

Coincidentally, Ferrier had received a proposal to direct the laboratory of experimental neurology at the Stanley Royd Hospital, a psychiatric hospital located in Yorkshire. The hospital's director was the psychiatrist James Crichton-Browne (1840–1938). Working under good material conditions and having an abundance of animals for experimentation (mainly rabbits, guinea pigs and dogs), Ferrier started his experiments in 1873, examining experimental lesions and electrical stimulation of the cerebral cortex. Upon his return to London, the Royal Society sponsored the extension of his stimulation experiments to macaque monkeys, work he undertook at the Brown Institution in Lambeth. By the end of the year, he had reported his first results to local and national meetings and had published an account in West Riding Lunatic Asylum Medical Reports.

Ferrier had succeeded in demonstrating that the low intensity faradic stimulation of the cortex in both animal species indicated a rather precise and specific map for motor functions. The same areas, upon being lesioned, caused the loss of the functions which were elicited by stimulation. Ferrier was also able to demonstrate that the high-intensity stimulation of motor cortical areas caused repetitive movements in the neck, face and limbs which were highly evocative of epileptic fits seen by neurologists in human beings and animals, which probably were due to a spread of the focus of stimulation, an interpretation very much in line with Jacksonanian thought.

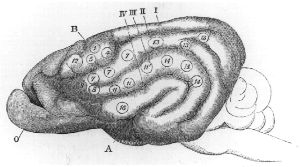
A dog cortical map obtained by Ferrier using the electrical stimulation of the brain

In June 1876, he was elected a Fellow of the Royal Society at the age of 33 and Fellow of the Royal College of Physicians the following year. He was also the first physiologist to make a transposition (if scientifically incorrect) of cortical maps obtained in monkeys to the human brain. This proposal soon led to practical consequences in neurology and neurosurgery.

A Scottish surgeon, Sir William Macewen (1848–1924), and two English physicians (clinical neurologist Hughes Bennett, and Rickman J. Godlee) demonstrated in 1884, that it was possible to use a precise clinical examination to determine the possible site of a tumor or lesion in the brain, by observing its effects on the side and extension of alterations in motor and sensory functions. This method of functional neurological mapping is still used today. Jackson and Ferrier were present at the first operation performed by Godlee on 25 November 1884. Godlee was a nephew of the eminent physician Sir Joseph Lister (1827–1912), the discoverer of surgical antisepsis.

Practical results of animal research were used to justify Ferrier before a noisy public persecution carried out by antivivisectionist societies against him and other scientists, who were accused of inhumane use of animals for experimental medicine. The case, in 1881, saw his acquittal.

In 1892, Ferrier was one of the founding members of the National Society for the Employment of Epileptics (now the National Society for Epilepsy), along with Sir William Gowers and John Hughlings Jackson.

He received a knighthood in 1911.

== Death ==
He died of pneumonia on 19 March 1928 in London. He left a widow, Constance (née Waterlow, sister of painter Ernest Albert Waterlow), they had a son and daughter; several of his scientific papers were illustrated by Waterlow. His son Claude was a well-known architect.

The Royal Society created the Ferrier Medal and lectureship in his honour; it is still running in 2025.

== Works ==
Of Ferrier's publications, two books are particularly notable. The first one, published in 1876, The Functions of the Brain, describes his experimental results. In 1886, he published a new edition, considerably expanded and reviewed.

His second book was published two years later, The Localization of Brain Disease It had as its subject the clinical applications of cortical localization.

Some of his speeches were also published.

Ferrier was one of the founders of the journal Brain, together with his friends Hughlings Jackson and Crichton-Browne. The journal was dedicated to the interaction between experimental and clinical neurology and is still published today. In 1878 Ferrier delivered the Goulstonian Lecture to the Royal College of Physicians on "The localisation of cerebral diseases".
