= Henry Maudsley =

English psychiatrist (1835–1918)

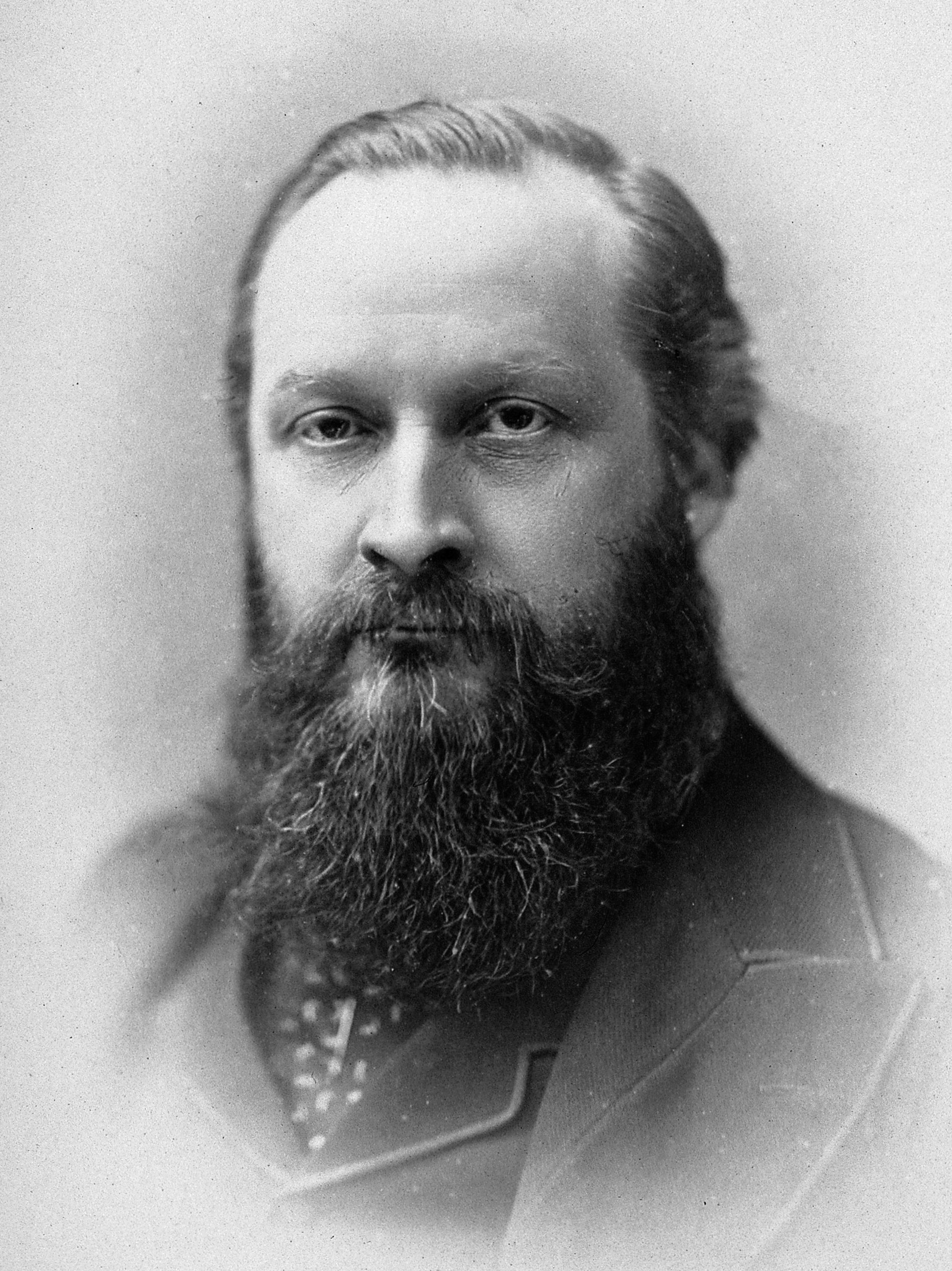
- Photograph by G. Jerrard, 1881.
- Born: 5 February 1835; Giggleswick, Yorkshire, England
- Died: 23 January 1918 (aged 82); Bushey Heath, Hertfordshire, England
- Education: University College London
- Scientific career
- Fields: Psychiatry

Henry Maudsley FRCP (5 February 1835 – 23 January 1918) was a pioneering English psychiatrist, commemorated in the Maudsley Hospital in London and in the annual Maudsley Lecture of the Royal College of Psychiatrists.

== Life and career ==
Maudsley was born on an isolated farm near Giggleswick in the North Riding of Yorkshire and educated at Giggleswick School. Maudsley lost his mother at an early age. An aunt cared for him, teaching him poetry which he would recite to the servants, and secured for him a top tutor and an expensive apprenticeship to University College London medical school. He earned ten gold medals and graduated with an M.D. degree in 1857, though is said to have avoided subjects and clinical work he found onerous and to have antagonised his teachers.

Maudsley had apparently intended to pursue a career in surgery, but according to his autobiography, he changed his mind when he failed to receive a reply to his first application: it had gone to his previous address. He then decided to leave the country and work for the East India Company, although in the event he never did. It would require him first to do a stint in an asylum, and so he spent nine months at the West Riding Asylum in Wakefield, followed less happily by a shorter period at the Essex County Asylum in Brentwood.

At the age of 23, Maudsley was appointed medical superintendent at the small, middle-class Manchester Royal Lunatic Asylum in Cheadle Royal. Despite being relatively inexperienced clinically and administratively, he managed to raise patient numbers and income. He returned to London in 1862, taking up residence in Queen Anne St, Cavendish Square. In 1865 he failed to gain the position of Physician to the Bethlem Royal Hospital, but succeeded at the West London Hospital.

So ended Maudsley's relatively brief period in public and charitable asylums. In the same year he was appointed co-editor of the Journal of Mental Science, an influential position he retained for 15 years.

Maudsley was elected a Fellow of the Royal College of Physicians and delivered their Gulstonian Lectures in 1870 on Body and Mind. The text of Maudsley's lectures was studied carefully by Charles Darwin in the preparation of his The Expression of the Emotions in Man and Animals (1872). Maudsley was appointed Professor of Medical Jurisprudence at University College London from 1869 to 1879.

Maudsley married John Conolly's daughter, Ann Conolly, in February 1866, and from 1866 took over the running of Conolly's private mental asylum, Lawn House, housing six wealthy women, until 1874. He then withdrew from public life and focused on writing and on an extremely lucrative and secretive private consultancy for the very wealthy, often aristocratic, in the West End of London.

== Influence ==
Maudsley acquired a reputation as an outstanding essayist on medical and literary topics. An early success was a spectacular essay on Edgar Allan Poe. He made numerous contributions to the Journal of Mental Science. His position as Britain's foremost mental specialist was sealed by his acquaintance with Charles Darwin and other leading Victorian intellectuals and by his magisterial textbooks The Physiology and Pathology of the Mind (1867), Body and Mind (1870) and Mental Responsibility in Health and Disease (1874). His popularity was exemplified by his influence on many novels by Rosa Nouchette Carey.

Maudsley adhered to degeneration theory and believed that inherited "taints" were exaggerated through succeeding generations (Lamarckism). He argued that alcoholism was the most frequent trigger of inherited degeneracy, and that drunkenness in one generation would lead to frenzied need for drink in the second, hypochondria in the third, and idiocy in the fourth. However, having significantly contributed to the British uptake of degeneration theory for over two decades, by the 1890s he was cautioning about it being used in a meaninglessly vague way.

His views on maternity have been critiqued for displaying a "revulsion to both parturition and the care of an infant," which he claimed was an expression of the rational objective truth. He was challenged even at the time for his generally negative views on women; a notable early critic was the pioneering female physician Elizabeth Garrett Anderson.

Maudsley has been described as "a prime example of how the medical establishment naturalised and reinforced social divisions and hierarchies during the latter part of the 19th century." He has also been described as "consistently inconsistent".

Maudsley was agnostic, and as such critical of religion and reports of ostensibly supernatural phenomena. In his book Natural Causes and Supernatural Seemings (1886) he wrote that so-called supernatural experiences were disorders of the mind and simply "malobservations and misinterpretations of nature". His book is seen as an early text in the field of anomalistic psychology.

== Maudsley Hospital ==
In 1907, Maudsley collaborated with Frederick Mott, a neuropathologist, to make an offer to London County Council to found a new Maudsley Hospital, for which Maudsley donated £30,000, with the council finding another £30,000 plus. This was to be a new mental hospital that would treat early and acute cases and have an out-patient clinic. The hospital also housed teaching and research. The buildings were ready in 1915, temporarily used for war veterans, and officially opened in 1923. A special Act of Parliament had made voluntary treatment there financially possible.

Maudsley's £30,000 has been described as an astonishingly high sum, and he still had at least £60,000 spare upon his death.

A bronze bust of Maudsley overlooks the main staircase at the Institute of Psychiatry, Psychology and Neuroscience next to the Maudsley Hospital.

== Later life ==
In his later years, Maudsley became something of a recluse, resigning from the Medico-Psychological Association and, in some scattered writings, expressing regret at his career choice of psychiatry. He submitted articles to the philosophy journal Mind, watched cricket matches and sent postcards.

While earlier he had argued, per Bénédict Morel, that degenerate families would die out, he began in the 1890s to consider degeneration as a regressive force and threat to evolution and moral progress. This appears to have had a significant influence on psychiatrists such as George Alder Blumer who became at least for some time converts to eugenics.

Maudsley's wife died before him, and they had no children.

He appears to have destroyed his own papers and correspondence.

== Quotes ==
"Mental disorders are neither more nor less than nervous diseases in which mental symptoms predominate, and their entire separation from other nervous diseases has been a sad hindrance to progress...." Henry Maudsley (1870) Body and Mind, page 41.

"Maudsley was revealed to me in a brilliant essay on Edgar Allan Poe, which....although too scathing and denunciatory....was so rich in insight....as to betoken the "lighting of another taper at Heaven," which was at that time Maudsley's way of describing the arrival of a new man of genius on the scene. A few years later I made Maudsley's personal acquaintance at the table of that gracefully-refined and highly gifted physician and philanthropist, Dr John Conolly, who afterwards became his father-in-law...." James Crichton-Browne (1920) The First Maudsley Lecture.

"A rich source of wrong beliefs is the prolific activity of imagination....by filling up voids of knowledge with fictions and theories, its quick and easy working is a striking contrast with the slow and toilsome work of observation and reasoning. Being the productive force in mind, it has, like the productive forces in nature, three marked qualities: it is prolific, it is pleasant, it is prophetic." Henry Maudsley (1886) Natural Causes and Supernatural Seemings.

== Works ==
- The Physiology and Pathology of the Mind, D. Appleton & Company, 1867.
- Body and Mind: An Inquiry into their Connection and Mutual Influence, D. Appleton and Company, 1871.
- Responsibility in Mental Disease, D. Appleton and Co., 1896 [1st Pub. H. S. King, 1874].
- The Physiology of Mind, Macmillan & Co., 1876 [Enlarged and revised, 3rd edition].
- The Pathology of Mind, Macmillan, 1879 [of the 1867 work].
- Body and Will: In its Metaphysical, Physiological and Pathological Aspects, D. Appleton & Co., 1884 [1st Pub. Kegan, Paul, Trench & Co., 1883].
- Natural Causes and Supernatural Seemings, Kegan, Paul, Trench & Co., 1886.
- Life in Mind and Conduct: Studies of Organic in Human Nature, Macmillan & Co., 1902.
- Heredity, Variation and Genius, with Essay on Shakespeare and Address on Medicine, John Bale, Sons & Danielsson, 1908.
- Organic to Human: Psychological and Sociological, Macmillan & Co., Ltd., 1916.
- Religion and Realities, John Bale, Sons & Danielsson, 1918.

=== Articles ===
- "The Love of Life", The Journal of Mental Science, Vol. VII, N°. 36, January 1861.
- "The Genesis of Mind", The Journal of Mental Science, Vol. VII, N°. 40, January 1862.
- "Delusions", The Journal of Mental Science, Vol. IX, N°. 45, April 1863.
- "Homicidal Insanity", The Journal of Mental Science, Vol. IX, N°. 47, October 1863.
- "Considerations with Regard to Hereditary Influence", The Journal of Mental Science, Vol. IX, N°. 48, January 1864.
- "Insanity and its Treatment", The Journal of Mental Science, Vol. XVII, N°. 79, October 1871.
- "Sex in Mind and Education", The Fortnightly Review, Vol. XV, 1874. Also available from https://en.wikisource.org/wiki/Popular_Science_Monthly
- "The Alleged Increase of Insanity", The Journal of Mental Science, Vol. XXIII, N°. 101, April 1877.
- "Hallucinations of the Senses", The Eclectic Magazine, Vol. XXVIII, July/December 1878.
- "Alleged Suicide of a Dog", Mind, Vol. 4, No. 15, Jul. 1879.
- "The Moral Sense and Will in Criminals", The Medico-Legal Journal, Vol. II, 1885.
- "The Physical Conditions of Consciousness", Mind, Vol. 12, No. 48, Oct. 1887.
- "Remarks on Crime and Criminals", The Journal of Mental Science, Vol. XXXIV, N°. 146, July 1888.
- "The Double Brain", Mind, Vol. 14, No. 54, April 1889.
- "The Physical Basis of Mind", The Forum, February 1891.
- "Memory" in Little Masterpieces of Science, George Iles, ed., Doubleday, Page & Company, 1902.
- "Optimism and Pessimism", The Journal of Mental Science, Vol. LXIII, N°. 260, January 1917.
- "Materialism and Spiritualism", The Journal of Mental Science, Vol. LXIII, October 1917.

=== Miscellany ===
- "An Address on Medical Psychology," The Journal of Mental Science, Vol. XVIII, 1873.
- "Introductory Lecture Delivered at University College, on October 2nd 1876," The Lancet, N°. 12, December 1876.

== See also ==
- Henry Maudslay, another 19th-century Englishman, who was an important machine tool pioneer
- James Crichton-Browne, contemporary Scottish psychiatrist
