= Jesper Mogensen =

Danish neuroscientist

Jesper Mogensen was a Danish neuroscientist who worked as a professor at the University of Copenhagen, Department of Psychology, and was the founder and head of The Unit for Cognitive Neuroscience (UCN) and director of the Research Centre for Brain Injury Rehabilitation (ReCBIR).

Some of his primary research areas included Cognitive neuroscience; Functional recovery; Learning; Memory; Comparative neuropsychology etc. More specifically, Jesper Mogensen had among other things recently developed the Reorganization of Elementary Functions (REF) - a model that deals with the seeming contradiction between the localization and post-traumatic recovery of various functions in the brain with respect to the understanding of neural substrate and post-traumatic recovery of cognitive functions in general.

Some of his new research conducted on rats suggests that a combination of stress and exercise could shorten rehabilitation time after a potential stroke. Summarized by Niels Ebdrup: "Professor Mogensen's research in rats can explain the mystery of how human beings can relearn how to talk and find their way around despite damage to a significant part of the brain."

Prof. Mogensen also occasionally appeared on Danish TV, radio broadcasts and in the written press concerning various scientific matters, for instance, brain doping, exercise and stress.

In 1980 he finished his interdisciplinary studies at the University of Copenhagen (primarily in medicine and psychology) and became a Mag.art in neuroscience and psychology in 1985.

== Publications ==
Some of Mogensen's recent publications are listed below:

Mogensen, J 2012, ' Reorganization of Elementary Functions (REF) after Brain Injury: Implications for the Therapeutic Interventions and Prognosis of Brain Injured Patients Suffering Cognitive Impairments '. i AJ Schäfer & J Müller (red), Brain Damage: Causes, Management and Prognosis. Nova Science Publishers, Inc., Hauppauge, NY

Mogensen, J 2012, ' Cognitive recovery and rehabilitation after brain injury: Mechanisms, challenges and support '. i A Agrawal (red.), Brain injury - Functional aspects, rehabilitation and prevention. InTech, Rijeka, Croatia

Mogensen, J 2011, ' Reorganization of the injured brain: implications for studies of the neural substrate of cognition ' Frontiers in Psychology, vol 2:7

Mogensen, J 2011, ' Animal models in neuroscience '. i J Hau & SJ Schapiro (red), Handbook of Laboratory Animal Science: Vol. II. Animal Models. 3 udg, vol. II, CRC Press LLC, Boca Raton, Fl.

Mogensen, J 2011, ' Almost unlimited potentials of a limited neural plasticity ' Journal of Consciousness Studies, vol 18, nr. 7-8

Mogensen, J 2008, ' Hjerneskadeforskning - gennembrud, løfter og problemer: Stimulation og aktivering - af den hjerneskadede og forskningen ' Hovedcirklen, vol 19, nr. 2
