= Epilepsy Society =

British medical charity

- Type: Charitable organisation
- Registration no.: 206186
- Location: Chesham Lane, Chalfont St Peter, Buckinghamshire SL9 0RJ, UK
- Website: www.epilepsysociety.org.uk
- Formerly called: The National Society for Epilepsy

The Epilepsy Society (formerly known as the National Society for Epilepsy) is the largest medical charity in the field of epilepsy in the United Kingdom, providing services for people with epilepsy for over 100 years. Based in Chalfont St Peter, Buckinghamshire, UK, its stated mission is "to enhance the quality of life of people affected by epilepsy by promoting research, education and public awareness and by delivering specialist medical care and support services." The Epilepsy Society has close partnerships with the National Hospital for Neurology and Neurosurgery and the UCL Institute of Neurology, both located in Queen Square, London.

== Services ==
Epilepsy Society is a leading epilepsy medical charity supporting all people affected by epilepsy. The services provided by the charity include:

- Residential care for over 100 adults within care homes at the Chalfont Centre and also in supported living accommodation.
- Diagnosis, assessment and treatment at the Sir William Gowers Centre in Chalfont, Buckinghamshire.
- Research into the causes, diagnosis and treatment of epilepsy. Research focuses on brain imaging and genetics.
- Epilepsy information, a national helpline and awareness raising programmes.
- Campaigning on issues to help all people affected by epilepsy live as full a life as possible
- Epilepsy training to external organisations.
- Employment opportunities for people with epilepsy.

== History ==
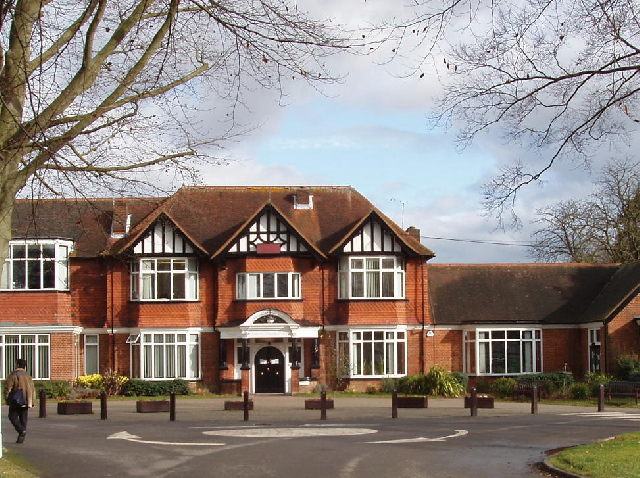
Passmore Edwards House, part of Chalfont Centre

In 1892, a group of physicians from National Hospital for the Paralysed and the Epileptic, together with various philanthropists, founded the National Society for the Employment of Epileptics. The first executive committee of the Society included the notable physicians John Hughlings Jackson, Sir William Gowers, and David Ferrier. The aim was to establish an agricultural colony where people with epilepsy could live and work. A 370-acre (1.5 km^{2}) farm was bought in Chalfont St Peter which at its peak in the 1950s, cared for over 550 people.

A National Health Service treatment unit was established at Chalfont in 1972. Around this time, the Society became known as The National Society for Epilepsy (NSE).

In 1995 a 1.5 tesla MRI scanner was installed - the first dedicated to research in epilepsy. This has now been superseded by a 3 tesla instrument in 2004, which produces higher resolution images. The NSE's MRI Unit is at the forefront of medical imaging research applied to epilepsy. In 2011 the charity changed its name to Epilepsy Society.

== Online safety ==
In April 2019, the Epilepsy Society launched a campaign to ban so-called epilepsy trolling, where online trolls target people with epilepsy, sending them flashing images and GIFs with the intent of triggering a seizure. Following a large-scale attack on people with epilepsy in May 2020, including an 8-year-old charity fundraiser named Zach Eagling, the Epilepsy Society titled the campaign "Zach's Law." After it emerged that no existing legislation specifically criminalised this type of trolling, the Zach's Law campaign was endorsed by the Law Commission, featured on the front cover of the Daily Express and in the Metro. MPs including Dean Russell, Suzanne Webb, Kim Leadbeater and John Nicolson backed the campaign and met with Eagling on several occasions. On 5 December 2022, Zach's Law was officially included in the Government's Online Safety Bill and became law in September 2023 when the Bill completed its passage through Parliament. The law criminalises the deliberate sending of flashing images to a person with epilepsy with the intent of triggering a seizure, and offenders could face up to five years in jail.
