= Crichton-Browne sign =

Clinical sign

Crichton-Browne sign is a clinical sign in which there is twitching of the outer margins of the eyes and mouth. It is an early sign of general paralysis of the insane.

The sign was described by Sir James Crichton-Browne.
