= Brain (journal) =

- Discipline: Neurology, neuroscience
- Language: English
- Edited by: Masud Husain

Publication details
- History: 1878–present
- Publisher: Oxford University Press
- Frequency: Monthly
- Impact factor: 11.7 (2024)

Standard abbreviations
- ISO 4: Brain

Indexing
- CODEN: BRAIAK
- ISSN: 0006-8950 (print); 1460-2156 (web)
- LCCN: 66084758
- OCLC no.: 1536984

Links
- Journal homepage; Online access; Online archive

Brain: A Journal of Neurology is a peer-reviewed scientific journal of neurology, founded in 1878 by John Charles Bucknill, David Ferrier, James Crichton-Browne and John Hughlings Jackson. It is published by Oxford University Press.

The journal was edited by John Newsom-Davis from 1997 to 2004, Alastair Compston (Cambridge University) until 2013, and Dimitri Kullmann (UCL) until 2021. The current editor-in-chief is Masud Husain (University of Oxford).

According to the Journal Citation Reports, the journal has a 2022 impact factor of 14.5.
