= Hitzig =

Hitzig is the last name of:

- Eduard Hitzig (1838–1907), German brain scientist
- Felix Hitzig (born 1988), German politician
- Ferdinand Hitzig (1807–1875), German Protestant theologian
- Friedrich Hitzig (1811–1881), German Jewish architect
- Julius Eduard Hitzig (1780 - 1849), German jurist and publisher.
