= Johann August Unzer =

German physician (1727–1799)

Johann August Unzer (April 27, 1727 – April 2, 1799) was a German physician whose work with the central nervous system, reflexes and consciousness impacted modern physiological studies.

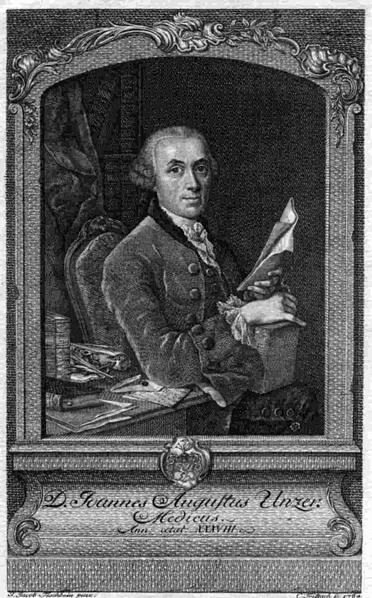
Johann August Unzer

== Life ==
Johann August Unzer was born on April 27, 1727, in Halle an der Saale, to a family of medical practitioners. His brother Johann Christoph Unzer was a physician of royalty, and his father was also a notable physician. At age twelve, he started to pursue his medical degree at the University of Halle, his hometown university. In his years at the university, he started exploring ideas such as emotion, and also ideas regarding the central nervous system. There, Unzer worked under a professor named Georg Ernst Stahl. While still attending university, he defended Stahl's views on animism by publishing one of his first works called "Thoughts on the Influence of the Soul on its Body". In 1748 at the age of twenty one, he received his MD. In 1749, he went on to complete his dissertation entitled "De Nexu Metaphysices cum Medicina generatim" and continued to work into the next year. After he graduated and completed his dissertational work, he went on to practice medicine in Hamburg, Germany while still developing his theories. Around this time, he started to publish on neuro-metaphysical matters in the Hamburg Magazine. He continued to do this until 1759, when he published his own medical journal called "The Physician". In the following years, he published several books and articles ranging from zoology, "The Principles of Physiology", and afferent and efferent reflexes. He died on April 2, 1799, in Altona, Germany where he was living at the time.

== Work ==
=== Zoology ===
As time passed, he started to turn from a Stahlian animism perspective to a physiological perspective on animal and human life. He conducted research in the area of zoology, a field that focused on all aspects of the animal kingdom. Unzer published a book called Erste Gründe ("first reasons"), which was later renamed The Principles of Physiology of the Proper Animal Nature of the Animal Organism. He focused on comparing nerves and their relationship with motions in animals. From there, he classified three types of motions: those motions that are conscious and voluntary, those that are conscious but not voluntary, and those that are unconscious and involuntary. After decapitating several animals, he compared higher animals to lower ones, and suggested that lower creatures that had no brain react to neural stimulus rather than brain activity". Unzer concluded that animals are like living machines, and through these decapitation observational studies, made the case that the brain contained the soul: "He proceeded from the notion of the animal as a machine to state that some animals (beseelte Tiere) have a soul that (unbeseelte Tiere) have neither soul nor brain, and are instead moved by animal "forces"". His ideas later came to be known as physiological metaphysics. After some time, he went on to conduct research on reflexes.

=== Reflexes ===
One of Unzer’s main contributions to science was the introduction of afferent and efferent reflexes. At its most basic level, afferent reflexes are those that move inward from something external, making its way to the central nervous system. Efferent then is the opposite, where the central nervous system triggers a reflex in the muscles. Unzer himself explains afferent reflexes: "To the end that an impression is felt…the external impression will have no other reflex action in the animal machines than that which is capable in virtue of its purely animal force, which it reflects upon the motor nerves…". He also goes on to explain efferent reflexes: "If, on the other hand, the external impression be also felt, then the mind, according to its psychological laws, connects volitionally with it many other conceptions, the internal impressions of which can produce through the motor nerves such sentient actions as the unfelt external impression could not have developed at all, or, at least, not in combination with the will of the animal. An example of the afferent reflex would be the traditional Patellar Reflex, which is also called the knee jerk reflex. An example of the efferent reflex may be the sucking reflex babies have at birth. He used reflexes to validate the point that animals without developed brains lack strong motor skills: "...we find animals without brain and without any traces of the mind, to be capable of very few kinds of movements".

=== Guillotine and Consciousness ===
Another major contribution that Unzer made was his study of consciousness. There was the question of whether or not consciousness was a product of all neural activity, or just higher functioning. After the first person was beheaded by Joseph Ignace Guillotin’s contraption named after him, there was a curiosity about whether there was any form of consciousness after the head was severed from the body, and whether or not it was painless. People wondered if beheading actually did kill the person entirely, because the body of a criminal would sometimes convulse for some time after the person was "killed". Unzer was one of the first to confront this problem. Using what he had observed from animals and their reactions to beheading, he concluded that the same phenomena could be applied to human beings as well. He said that if a signal had nowhere to go (i.e. once it reached the place where the head was severed), it may travel back through an efferent pathway, causing the motion that the person would have performed if he or she were whole. However, he argued such actions are still reflexes, and do not require conscious activity, because the brain is needed for conscious activity to occur. Therefore, he concluded that if there was no conscious experience due to the neural impulse never reaching a brain, there was no pain as well.

=== Major works ===
- De sternutatione
- Gedancken vom Einfluß der Seele in ihren Körper
- Philosophische Betrachtung des menschlichen Körpers überhaupt
- Erste Gründe einer Physiologie der eigentlichen thierischen Natur thierischer Körper
- Physiologische Untersuchungen auf Veranlassung der Göttingischen, Frankfurter, Leipziger und Hallischen Recensionen seiner Physiologie der thierischen Natur
- Medizinisches Handbuch
- Einleitung zur allgemeinen Pathologie der ansteckenden Krankheiten
- D. Johann August Unzers medicinisches Handbuch vom neuen ausgearbeitet
- The Principals of Physiology

== Death ==
He died on April 2, 1799, in Altona, Germany.
