= John Hughlings Jackson =

English neurologist (1835–1911)

John Hughlings Jackson FRS
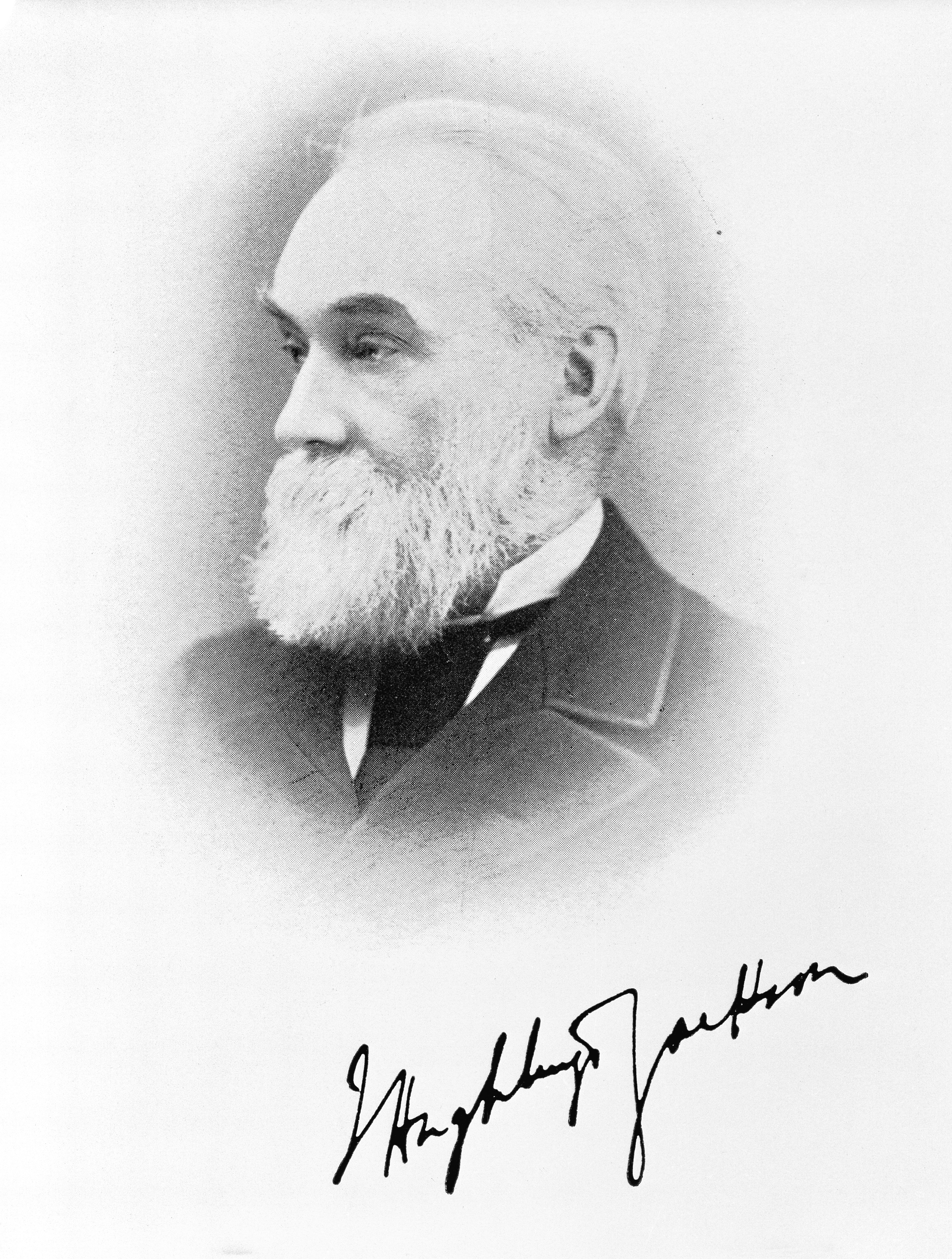
- Born: 4 April 1835; Providence Green, Green Hammerton, Yorkshire, England
- Died: 7 October 1911 (aged 76); London, England
- Scientific career
- Fields: Neurology

John Hughlings Jackson (4 April 1835 – 7 October 1911) was an English neurologist. He is best known for his research on epilepsy.

== Biography ==
He was born at Providence Green, Green Hammerton, near Harrogate, Yorkshire, the youngest son of Samuel Jackson, a brewer and yeoman who owned and farmed his land, and Sarah Jackson (née Hughlings), the daughter of a Welsh revenue collector. His mother died just over a year after giving birth to him. He had three brothers and a sister; his brothers emigrated to New Zealand and his sister married a physician. He was educated at Tadcaster, Yorkshire and Nailsworth, Gloucestershire before attending the York Medical and Surgical School. After qualifying at St Barts in 1856 he became house physician to the York Dispensary.

In 1859, he returned to London to work at the Metropolitan Free Hospital and the London Hospital. In 1862 he was appointed Assistant Physician, later (1869) full Physician at the National Hospital for Paralysis and Epilepsy located in Queen Square, London (now the National Hospital for Neurology and Neurosurgery) as well as Physician (1874) at the London Hospital. During this period he established his reputation as a neurologist. He was elected a Fellow of the Royal Society in 1878.

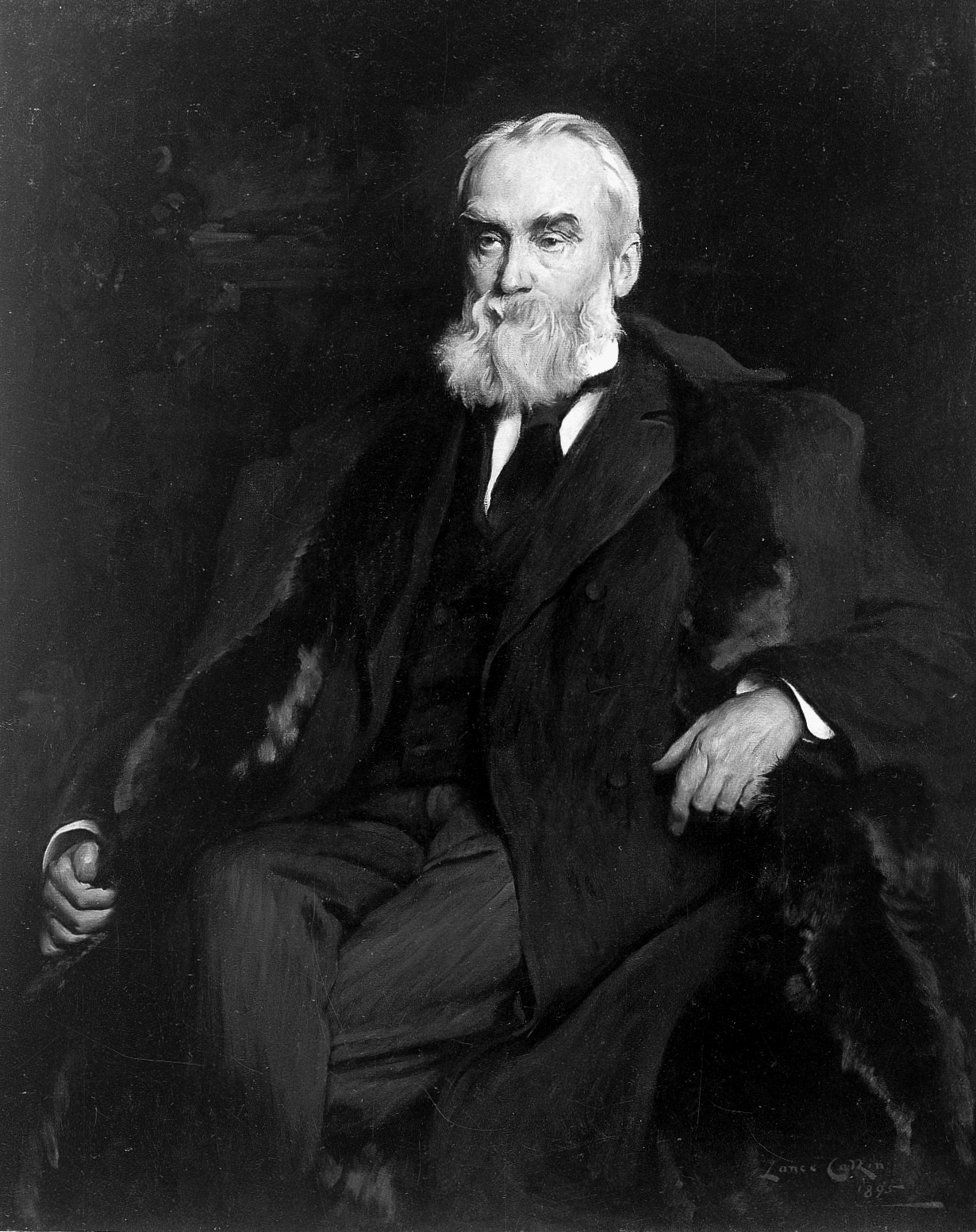
Portrait of John Hughlings Jackson by Lance Calkin

Jackson died in London on 7 October 1911 and was buried on the western side of Highgate Cemetery. He was an atheist. The Hull York Medical School building at the University of York is named in his honour.

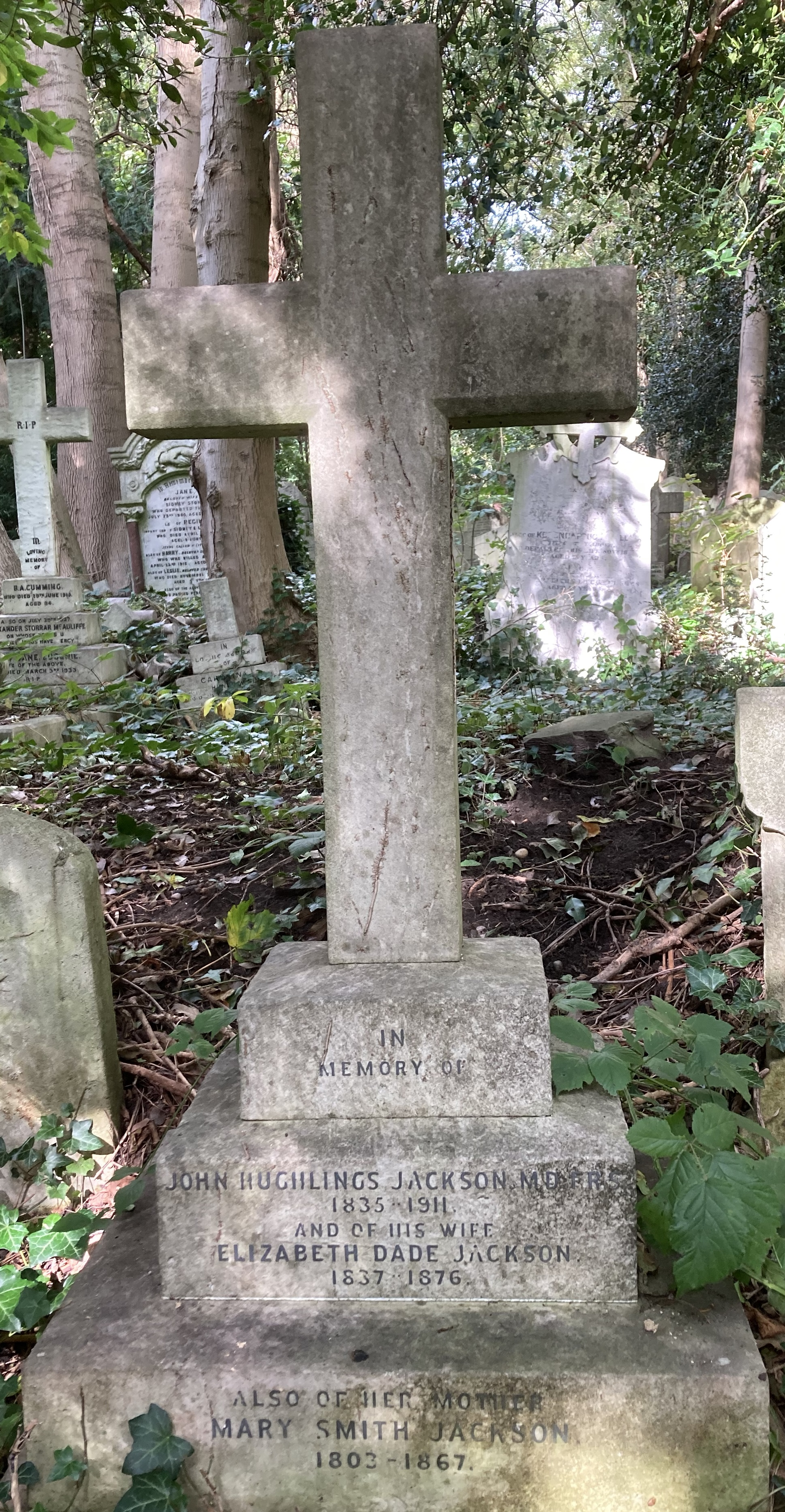
Grave of John Hughlings Jackson in Highgate Cemetery

== Science and research ==
Bust of John Hughlings Jackson, resident in the Institute of Neurology, London

Jackson was an innovative thinker and a prolific writer. He is best remembered for his contributions to the diagnosis and understanding of epilepsy. His name is attached eponymously to the characteristic "march" (The Jacksonian March) of symptoms in focal motor seizures and to the "dreamy state" of psychomotor seizures of temporal lobe origin. His papers on the latter variety of epilepsy have remained relevant due to their descriptive clinical detail and analysis of the relationship of psychomotor epilepsy to various patterns of pathological automatism and other mental and behavioural disorders.

Jackson also did research on aphasia, noting that some aphasic children were able to sing, even though they had lost the power of voluntary speech. He also studied what types of language loss was found in patients with left-brain injury, including set phrases, such as "Good bye" and "Oh, dear."

In his youth Jackson had been interested in conceptual issues and it is believed that in 1859 he contemplated the idea of abandoning medicine for philosophy. Thus, an important part of his work concerned the evolutionary organization of the nervous system for which he proposed three levels: a lower, a middle, and a higher. At the lowest level, movements were to be represented in their least complex form; such centres lie in the medulla and spinal cord. The middle level consists of the so-called motor area of the cortex, and the highest motor levels are found in the prefrontal area.

The higher centres inhibited the lower ones and hence lesions thereat caused 'negative' symptoms (due to an absence of function). 'Positive' symptoms were caused by the functional release of the lower centres. This process Jackson called 'dissolution', a term he borrowed from Herbert Spencer. The 'positive-negative' distinction he took from Sir John Reynolds.

Continental psychiatrists and psychologists (e.g. Théodule Ribot, Pierre Janet, Sigmund Freud, Henri Ey) have been more influenced by Jackson's theoretical ideas than their British counterparts. During the 1980s, the 'positive-negative' distinction was introduced in relation to the symptoms of schizophrenia.

He was one of only a few physicians to have delivered the Goulstonian (1869), Croonian (1884) and Lumleian (1890) lectures to the Royal College of Physicians. He also delivered the 1872 Hunterian Oration to the Hunterian Society.

=== Methodology ===
Jackson could not use modern sophisticated neuro-investigative technology (it had not been invented), but had to rely upon his own powers of clinical observation, deductive logic and autopsy data. Some of his eminent successors in the field of British neurology have been critical of many of his theories and concepts; but as Sir Francis Walshe remarked of his work in 1943, " ... when all that is obsolete or irrelevant is discarded there remains a rich treasure of physiological insight we cannot afford to ignore."

In Otfrid Foerster's research on the motor cortex, he cites exclusively Hughlings Jackson for the initial discovery (although without evidence) of the brain as the spring of neurological motor signalling.

== Contributions ==
Together with his friends Sir David Ferrier and Sir James Crichton-Browne, two eminent neuropsychiatrists of his time, Jackson was one of the founders of the important journal Brain, which was dedicated to the interaction between experimental and clinical neurology (still being published today). Its inaugural issue was published in 1878.

In 1892, Jackson was one of the founding members of the National Society for the Employment of Epileptics (now the National Society for Epilepsy), along with Sir William Gowers and Sir David Ferrier.

Oliver Sacks repeatedly cited Jackson as an inspiration in his neurologic work.
