= Eduard Hitzig =

German neurologist and neuropsychiatrist

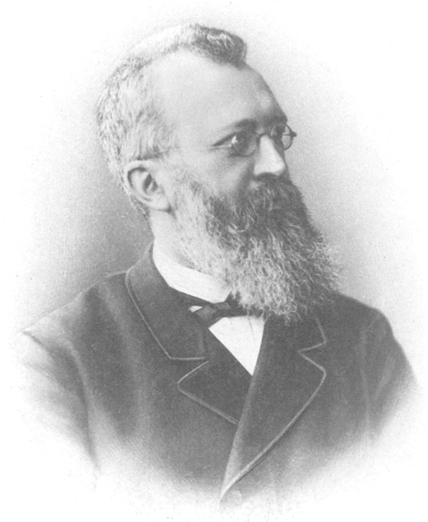
- Eduard Hitzig
- Born: 6 February 1838; Berlin, Brandenburg
- Died: 20 August 1907 (aged 69); Luisenheim (residential care facilities), St. Blasien, Southern Black Forest, Baden
- Education: University of Würzburg, University of Berlin
- Known for: pioneer in neurophysiology
- Scientific career
- Fields: neurology, psychiatry
- Workplaces: University of Zurich, University of Halle

Eduard Hitzig (6 February 1838 – 20 August 1907) was a German neurologist and neuropsychiatrist of Jewish ancestry born in Berlin.

Eduard was the son of Friedrich Hitzig and his grandfather had converted to Protestantism. He studied medicine at the Universities of Berlin and Würzburg under the instruction of famous men such as Emil Du Bois-Reymond (1818–1896), Rudolf Virchow (1821–1902), Moritz Heinrich Romberg (1795–1873), and Karl Friedrich Otto Westphal (1833–1890). He received his doctorate in 1862 and subsequently worked in Berlin and Würzburg. In 1875, he became director of the Burghölzli asylum, as well as professor of psychiatry at the University of Zurich. In 1885, Hitzig became a professor at the University of Halle where he remained until his retirement in 1903.

Hitzig is remembered for his work concerning the interaction between electric current and the brain. In 1870, Hitzig, assisted by anatomist Gustav Fritsch (1837–1927), applied electricity via a thin probe to the exposed cerebral cortex of a dog without anesthesia. They performed these studies at the home of Fritsch because the University of Berlin would not allow such experimentation in their laboratories. What Hitzig and Fritsch had discovered is that electrical stimulation of different areas of the cerebrum caused involuntary muscular contractions of specific parts of the dog's body. They identified the brain's "motor strip", a vertical strip of brain tissue on the cerebrum in the back of the frontal lobe, which controls different muscles in the body. In 1870, Hitzig published his findings in an essay called Ueber die elektrische Erregbarkeit des Grosshirns (On the Electrical Excitability of the Cerebrum). This experimentation was considered the first time anyone had done any localized study regarding the brain and electric current.

However this was not the first time Hitzig had experienced the interaction between the brain and electricity; earlier in his career as a physician working with the Prussian Army, he experimented on wounded soldiers whose skulls were fractured by bullets. Hitzig noticed that applying a small electric current to the brains of these soldiers caused involuntary muscular movement.

Hitzig and Fritsch's work opened the door to further localized testing of the brain by many others including Scottish neurologist, David Ferrier.
