= Gustav Fritsch =

German anatomist and traveller (1838–1927)

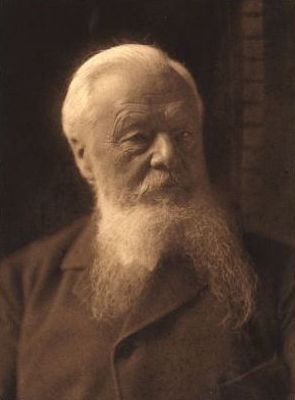
Gustav Fritsch: by Rudolf Dührkoop (c.1900).

Gustav Theodor Fritsch (5 March 1838 – 12 June 1927) was a German anatomist, anthropologist, traveller and physiologist from Cottbus.

Fritsch studied natural science and medicine in Berlin, Breslau and Heidelberg. In 1874 he became an associate professor of physiology at the University of Berlin, where he was later appointed head of the histological department at the physiological institute.

He is known for his work with neuropsychiatrist Eduard Hitzig (1839–1907) involving the localization of the motor areas of the brain. In 1870, the two scientists probed the cerebral cortex of a dog to discover that electrical stimulation of different areas of the cerebrum caused involuntary muscular contractions of specific parts of the dog's body.

Along with his medical studies, Fritsch was also known for his ethnographical research in southern Africa (1863–66), during which time he traveled from Cape Town through the Orange Free State, Basutoland, Natal and Bechuanaland.

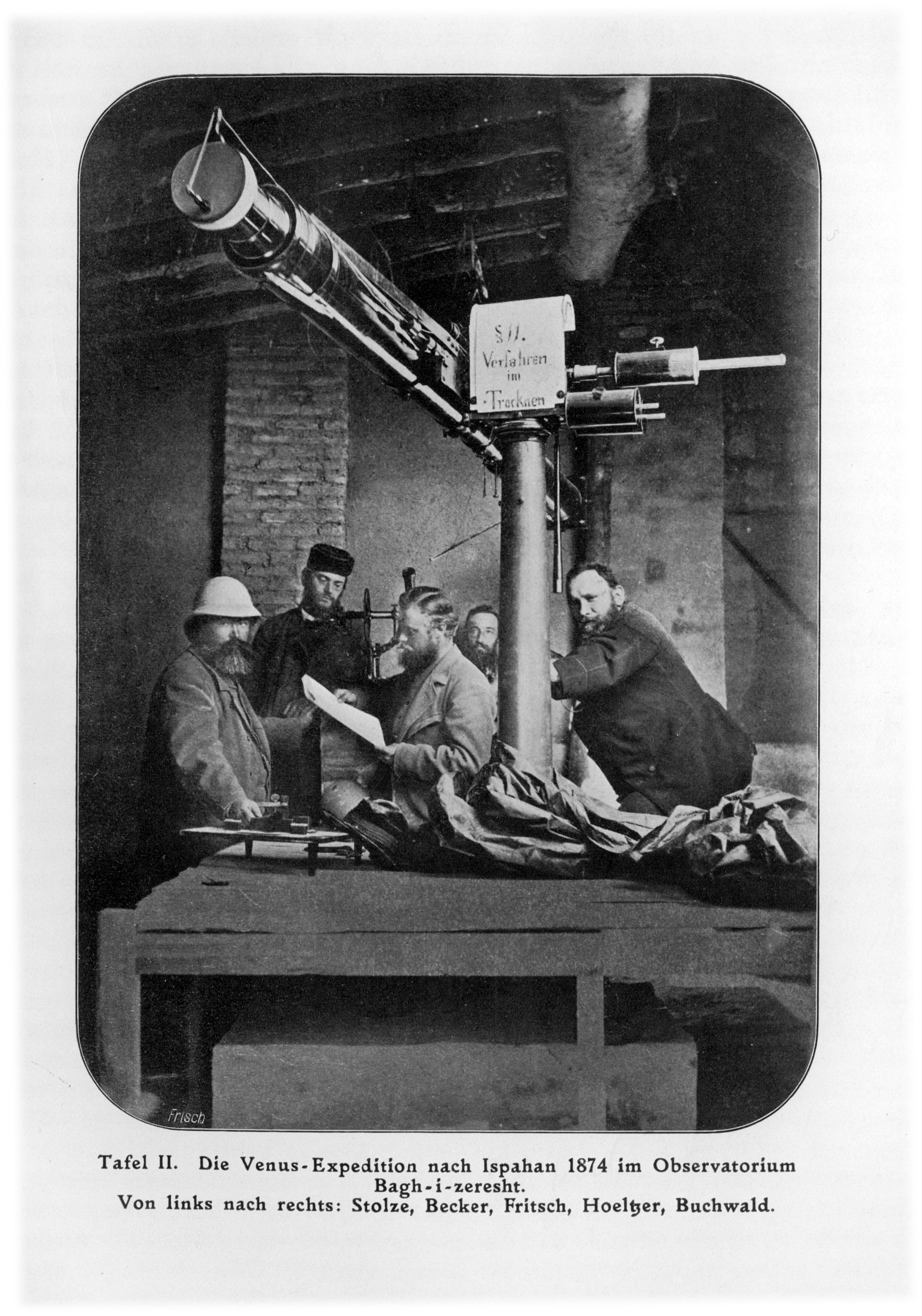
Research trip to Isfahan to observe the Venus transit of 1874, Fritsch third from left

In 1868 he took part in an expedition to Aden to observe a solar eclipse (18 August), afterwards traveling to Egypt, where he accompanied Johannes Dümichen (1833-1894) on an archaeological and photographic expedition. In 1874, he journeyed to Isfahan to observe the transit of Venus. He also performed zoological research in Anatolia, and in 1881/82 studied electric fish in regions of the eastern Mediterranean.

== Selected works ==
- Drei Jahre in Süd-Afrika: Reiseskizzen nach Notizen des Tagebuchs zusammengestellt. (Three years in South Africa: Travelogues arranged after notes of the diary) Hirt, Breslau 1868.
- Ueber die elektrische Erregbarkeit des Grosshirns. Archiv für Anatomie, Physiologie und wissenschaftliche Medicin: (with Eduard Hitzig) 300–332, 1870.
- Die Eingeborenen Süd-Afrika's: ethnographisch und anatomisch beschrieben. (Ethnographic and anatomic research in South Africa) Hirt, Breslau 1872.
- Vergleichend-anatomische Betrachtung der elektrischen Organe von Gymnotus electricus. (Comparative anatomical view of the electrical organs of "Gymnotus electricus") Veit, Leipzig 1881.
